

97001–97100 

|-bgcolor=#E9E9E9
| 97001 ||  || — || October 4, 1999 || Catalina || CSS || MRX || align=right | 2.5 km || 
|-id=002 bgcolor=#E9E9E9
| 97002 ||  || — || October 4, 1999 || Catalina || CSS || WIT || align=right | 2.2 km || 
|-id=003 bgcolor=#E9E9E9
| 97003 ||  || — || October 4, 1999 || Catalina || CSS || — || align=right | 4.3 km || 
|-id=004 bgcolor=#E9E9E9
| 97004 ||  || — || October 4, 1999 || Catalina || CSS || — || align=right | 5.7 km || 
|-id=005 bgcolor=#d6d6d6
| 97005 ||  || — || October 6, 1999 || Socorro || LINEAR || — || align=right | 5.0 km || 
|-id=006 bgcolor=#E9E9E9
| 97006 ||  || — || October 6, 1999 || Socorro || LINEAR || — || align=right | 3.7 km || 
|-id=007 bgcolor=#E9E9E9
| 97007 ||  || — || October 9, 1999 || Catalina || CSS || — || align=right | 2.3 km || 
|-id=008 bgcolor=#E9E9E9
| 97008 ||  || — || October 8, 1999 || Socorro || LINEAR || EUN || align=right | 2.6 km || 
|-id=009 bgcolor=#E9E9E9
| 97009 ||  || — || October 10, 1999 || Kitt Peak || Spacewatch || — || align=right | 3.4 km || 
|-id=010 bgcolor=#E9E9E9
| 97010 ||  || — || October 9, 1999 || Socorro || LINEAR || — || align=right | 3.8 km || 
|-id=011 bgcolor=#E9E9E9
| 97011 ||  || — || October 9, 1999 || Socorro || LINEAR || — || align=right | 2.8 km || 
|-id=012 bgcolor=#E9E9E9
| 97012 ||  || — || October 13, 1999 || Socorro || LINEAR || XIZ || align=right | 2.3 km || 
|-id=013 bgcolor=#d6d6d6
| 97013 ||  || — || October 10, 1999 || Socorro || LINEAR || THM || align=right | 3.3 km || 
|-id=014 bgcolor=#E9E9E9
| 97014 ||  || — || October 12, 1999 || Socorro || LINEAR || EUN || align=right | 2.9 km || 
|-id=015 bgcolor=#E9E9E9
| 97015 ||  || — || October 14, 1999 || Socorro || LINEAR || — || align=right | 4.0 km || 
|-id=016 bgcolor=#E9E9E9
| 97016 ||  || — || October 14, 1999 || Socorro || LINEAR || MAR || align=right | 6.2 km || 
|-id=017 bgcolor=#E9E9E9
| 97017 ||  || — || October 15, 1999 || Kitt Peak || Spacewatch || — || align=right | 2.2 km || 
|-id=018 bgcolor=#fefefe
| 97018 ||  || — || October 3, 1999 || Socorro || LINEAR || — || align=right | 2.9 km || 
|-id=019 bgcolor=#E9E9E9
| 97019 ||  || — || October 6, 1999 || Socorro || LINEAR || — || align=right | 2.5 km || 
|-id=020 bgcolor=#d6d6d6
| 97020 ||  || — || October 6, 1999 || Socorro || LINEAR || — || align=right | 7.0 km || 
|-id=021 bgcolor=#E9E9E9
| 97021 ||  || — || October 7, 1999 || Socorro || LINEAR || — || align=right | 3.1 km || 
|-id=022 bgcolor=#d6d6d6
| 97022 ||  || — || October 7, 1999 || Socorro || LINEAR || THM || align=right | 6.0 km || 
|-id=023 bgcolor=#E9E9E9
| 97023 ||  || — || October 8, 1999 || Socorro || LINEAR || EUN || align=right | 2.3 km || 
|-id=024 bgcolor=#E9E9E9
| 97024 ||  || — || October 9, 1999 || Socorro || LINEAR || — || align=right | 4.7 km || 
|-id=025 bgcolor=#E9E9E9
| 97025 ||  || — || October 9, 1999 || Socorro || LINEAR || EUN || align=right | 2.8 km || 
|-id=026 bgcolor=#E9E9E9
| 97026 ||  || — || October 10, 1999 || Socorro || LINEAR || PAD || align=right | 5.3 km || 
|-id=027 bgcolor=#E9E9E9
| 97027 ||  || — || October 10, 1999 || Socorro || LINEAR || — || align=right | 3.2 km || 
|-id=028 bgcolor=#E9E9E9
| 97028 ||  || — || October 11, 1999 || Socorro || LINEAR || — || align=right | 2.9 km || 
|-id=029 bgcolor=#E9E9E9
| 97029 ||  || — || October 14, 1999 || Socorro || LINEAR || — || align=right | 4.0 km || 
|-id=030 bgcolor=#E9E9E9
| 97030 ||  || — || October 18, 1999 || Olathe || Olathe || — || align=right | 2.3 km || 
|-id=031 bgcolor=#E9E9E9
| 97031 ||  || — || October 19, 1999 || Fountain Hills || C. W. Juels || EUN || align=right | 3.7 km || 
|-id=032 bgcolor=#E9E9E9
| 97032 ||  || — || October 20, 1999 || Oohira || T. Urata || — || align=right | 6.0 km || 
|-id=033 bgcolor=#E9E9E9
| 97033 ||  || — || October 31, 1999 || Prescott || P. G. Comba || — || align=right | 2.1 km || 
|-id=034 bgcolor=#FA8072
| 97034 ||  || — || October 30, 1999 || Socorro || LINEAR || — || align=right | 3.2 km || 
|-id=035 bgcolor=#E9E9E9
| 97035 ||  || — || October 29, 1999 || Catalina || CSS || — || align=right | 5.1 km || 
|-id=036 bgcolor=#E9E9E9
| 97036 ||  || — || October 29, 1999 || Catalina || CSS || — || align=right | 6.9 km || 
|-id=037 bgcolor=#E9E9E9
| 97037 ||  || — || October 29, 1999 || Catalina || CSS || — || align=right | 2.8 km || 
|-id=038 bgcolor=#E9E9E9
| 97038 ||  || — || October 29, 1999 || Catalina || CSS || — || align=right | 3.1 km || 
|-id=039 bgcolor=#E9E9E9
| 97039 ||  || — || October 29, 1999 || Catalina || CSS || — || align=right | 2.3 km || 
|-id=040 bgcolor=#E9E9E9
| 97040 ||  || — || October 29, 1999 || Catalina || CSS || — || align=right | 3.7 km || 
|-id=041 bgcolor=#E9E9E9
| 97041 ||  || — || October 29, 1999 || Catalina || CSS || — || align=right | 3.5 km || 
|-id=042 bgcolor=#d6d6d6
| 97042 ||  || — || October 30, 1999 || Kitt Peak || Spacewatch || — || align=right | 4.3 km || 
|-id=043 bgcolor=#E9E9E9
| 97043 ||  || — || October 28, 1999 || Catalina || CSS || — || align=right | 3.7 km || 
|-id=044 bgcolor=#E9E9E9
| 97044 ||  || — || October 30, 1999 || Catalina || CSS || — || align=right | 3.3 km || 
|-id=045 bgcolor=#E9E9E9
| 97045 ||  || — || October 31, 1999 || Kitt Peak || Spacewatch || — || align=right | 1.6 km || 
|-id=046 bgcolor=#E9E9E9
| 97046 ||  || — || October 31, 1999 || Kitt Peak || Spacewatch || — || align=right | 2.7 km || 
|-id=047 bgcolor=#E9E9E9
| 97047 ||  || — || October 31, 1999 || Catalina || CSS || — || align=right | 3.1 km || 
|-id=048 bgcolor=#E9E9E9
| 97048 ||  || — || October 28, 1999 || Catalina || CSS || ADE || align=right | 2.8 km || 
|-id=049 bgcolor=#E9E9E9
| 97049 ||  || — || October 29, 1999 || Catalina || CSS || — || align=right | 4.0 km || 
|-id=050 bgcolor=#E9E9E9
| 97050 ||  || — || October 31, 1999 || Catalina || CSS || ADE || align=right | 5.7 km || 
|-id=051 bgcolor=#E9E9E9
| 97051 ||  || — || October 30, 1999 || Catalina || CSS || — || align=right | 2.9 km || 
|-id=052 bgcolor=#E9E9E9
| 97052 ||  || — || October 30, 1999 || Catalina || CSS || MRX || align=right | 2.9 km || 
|-id=053 bgcolor=#E9E9E9
| 97053 ||  || — || October 30, 1999 || Catalina || CSS || — || align=right | 2.1 km || 
|-id=054 bgcolor=#E9E9E9
| 97054 ||  || — || October 30, 1999 || Catalina || CSS || — || align=right | 1.8 km || 
|-id=055 bgcolor=#E9E9E9
| 97055 ||  || — || October 31, 1999 || Catalina || CSS || ADE || align=right | 4.2 km || 
|-id=056 bgcolor=#E9E9E9
| 97056 ||  || — || October 31, 1999 || Catalina || CSS || MAR || align=right | 2.9 km || 
|-id=057 bgcolor=#E9E9E9
| 97057 ||  || — || October 31, 1999 || Catalina || CSS || — || align=right | 3.9 km || 
|-id=058 bgcolor=#E9E9E9
| 97058 ||  || — || October 30, 1999 || Anderson Mesa || LONEOS || — || align=right | 6.9 km || 
|-id=059 bgcolor=#d6d6d6
| 97059 ||  || — || November 1, 1999 || Kitt Peak || Spacewatch || KOR || align=right | 3.2 km || 
|-id=060 bgcolor=#E9E9E9
| 97060 ||  || — || November 1, 1999 || Catalina || CSS || — || align=right | 4.3 km || 
|-id=061 bgcolor=#E9E9E9
| 97061 ||  || — || November 5, 1999 || Višnjan Observatory || K. Korlević || — || align=right | 3.2 km || 
|-id=062 bgcolor=#d6d6d6
| 97062 ||  || — || November 5, 1999 || Oizumi || T. Kobayashi || EOS || align=right | 7.0 km || 
|-id=063 bgcolor=#fefefe
| 97063 ||  || — || November 2, 1999 || Socorro || LINEAR || H || align=right | 1.3 km || 
|-id=064 bgcolor=#E9E9E9
| 97064 ||  || — || November 2, 1999 || Kitt Peak || Spacewatch || — || align=right | 4.5 km || 
|-id=065 bgcolor=#d6d6d6
| 97065 ||  || — || November 9, 1999 || Nachi-Katsuura || Y. Shimizu, T. Urata || BRA || align=right | 3.2 km || 
|-id=066 bgcolor=#E9E9E9
| 97066 ||  || — || November 13, 1999 || Farra d'Isonzo || Farra d'Isonzo || — || align=right | 3.2 km || 
|-id=067 bgcolor=#E9E9E9
| 97067 ||  || — || November 12, 1999 || Višnjan Observatory || K. Korlević || — || align=right | 4.5 km || 
|-id=068 bgcolor=#E9E9E9
| 97068 ||  || — || November 12, 1999 || Višnjan Observatory || K. Korlević || — || align=right | 2.6 km || 
|-id=069 bgcolor=#E9E9E9
| 97069 Stek ||  ||  || November 12, 1999 || Gnosca || S. Sposetti || — || align=right | 2.6 km || 
|-id=070 bgcolor=#d6d6d6
| 97070 ||  || — || November 3, 1999 || Socorro || LINEAR || — || align=right | 8.2 km || 
|-id=071 bgcolor=#E9E9E9
| 97071 ||  || — || November 3, 1999 || Catalina || CSS || — || align=right | 5.4 km || 
|-id=072 bgcolor=#fefefe
| 97072 ||  || — || November 3, 1999 || Catalina || CSS || — || align=right | 1.6 km || 
|-id=073 bgcolor=#E9E9E9
| 97073 ||  || — || November 3, 1999 || Socorro || LINEAR || — || align=right | 4.6 km || 
|-id=074 bgcolor=#d6d6d6
| 97074 ||  || — || November 3, 1999 || Socorro || LINEAR || — || align=right | 5.9 km || 
|-id=075 bgcolor=#d6d6d6
| 97075 ||  || — || November 3, 1999 || Socorro || LINEAR || — || align=right | 6.4 km || 
|-id=076 bgcolor=#E9E9E9
| 97076 ||  || — || November 3, 1999 || Socorro || LINEAR || AGN || align=right | 2.7 km || 
|-id=077 bgcolor=#d6d6d6
| 97077 ||  || — || November 3, 1999 || Socorro || LINEAR || EOS || align=right | 4.4 km || 
|-id=078 bgcolor=#E9E9E9
| 97078 ||  || — || November 3, 1999 || Socorro || LINEAR || — || align=right | 3.1 km || 
|-id=079 bgcolor=#E9E9E9
| 97079 ||  || — || November 3, 1999 || Socorro || LINEAR || EUN || align=right | 5.2 km || 
|-id=080 bgcolor=#E9E9E9
| 97080 ||  || — || November 3, 1999 || Socorro || LINEAR || — || align=right | 3.8 km || 
|-id=081 bgcolor=#E9E9E9
| 97081 ||  || — || November 10, 1999 || Socorro || LINEAR || — || align=right | 3.4 km || 
|-id=082 bgcolor=#E9E9E9
| 97082 ||  || — || November 11, 1999 || Kitt Peak || Spacewatch || ADE || align=right | 5.9 km || 
|-id=083 bgcolor=#E9E9E9
| 97083 ||  || — || November 4, 1999 || Catalina || CSS || — || align=right | 2.7 km || 
|-id=084 bgcolor=#E9E9E9
| 97084 ||  || — || November 4, 1999 || Catalina || CSS || — || align=right | 3.9 km || 
|-id=085 bgcolor=#E9E9E9
| 97085 ||  || — || November 3, 1999 || Socorro || LINEAR || HNS || align=right | 2.8 km || 
|-id=086 bgcolor=#fefefe
| 97086 ||  || — || November 3, 1999 || Socorro || LINEAR || V || align=right | 1.8 km || 
|-id=087 bgcolor=#d6d6d6
| 97087 ||  || — || November 3, 1999 || Socorro || LINEAR || NAE || align=right | 6.7 km || 
|-id=088 bgcolor=#E9E9E9
| 97088 ||  || — || November 4, 1999 || Socorro || LINEAR || — || align=right | 3.2 km || 
|-id=089 bgcolor=#d6d6d6
| 97089 ||  || — || November 4, 1999 || Socorro || LINEAR || KOR || align=right | 2.9 km || 
|-id=090 bgcolor=#E9E9E9
| 97090 ||  || — || November 4, 1999 || Socorro || LINEAR || HEN || align=right | 2.1 km || 
|-id=091 bgcolor=#E9E9E9
| 97091 ||  || — || November 4, 1999 || Socorro || LINEAR || — || align=right | 3.2 km || 
|-id=092 bgcolor=#E9E9E9
| 97092 ||  || — || November 4, 1999 || Socorro || LINEAR || HEN || align=right | 1.9 km || 
|-id=093 bgcolor=#E9E9E9
| 97093 ||  || — || November 4, 1999 || Socorro || LINEAR || — || align=right | 3.5 km || 
|-id=094 bgcolor=#d6d6d6
| 97094 ||  || — || November 4, 1999 || Socorro || LINEAR || THM || align=right | 4.4 km || 
|-id=095 bgcolor=#d6d6d6
| 97095 ||  || — || November 4, 1999 || Socorro || LINEAR || NAE || align=right | 5.9 km || 
|-id=096 bgcolor=#d6d6d6
| 97096 ||  || — || November 4, 1999 || Socorro || LINEAR || KOR || align=right | 3.5 km || 
|-id=097 bgcolor=#E9E9E9
| 97097 ||  || — || November 4, 1999 || Socorro || LINEAR || — || align=right | 3.9 km || 
|-id=098 bgcolor=#E9E9E9
| 97098 ||  || — || November 4, 1999 || Socorro || LINEAR || MAR || align=right | 2.5 km || 
|-id=099 bgcolor=#E9E9E9
| 97099 ||  || — || November 4, 1999 || Socorro || LINEAR || — || align=right | 3.4 km || 
|-id=100 bgcolor=#E9E9E9
| 97100 ||  || — || November 4, 1999 || Socorro || LINEAR || — || align=right | 2.6 km || 
|}

97101–97200 

|-bgcolor=#E9E9E9
| 97101 ||  || — || November 4, 1999 || Socorro || LINEAR || ADE || align=right | 8.8 km || 
|-id=102 bgcolor=#d6d6d6
| 97102 ||  || — || November 4, 1999 || Socorro || LINEAR || — || align=right | 5.9 km || 
|-id=103 bgcolor=#E9E9E9
| 97103 ||  || — || November 4, 1999 || Socorro || LINEAR || — || align=right | 3.3 km || 
|-id=104 bgcolor=#d6d6d6
| 97104 ||  || — || November 4, 1999 || Socorro || LINEAR || KAR || align=right | 2.3 km || 
|-id=105 bgcolor=#E9E9E9
| 97105 ||  || — || November 4, 1999 || Socorro || LINEAR || — || align=right | 4.3 km || 
|-id=106 bgcolor=#d6d6d6
| 97106 ||  || — || November 4, 1999 || Socorro || LINEAR || KOR || align=right | 3.0 km || 
|-id=107 bgcolor=#E9E9E9
| 97107 ||  || — || November 4, 1999 || Kitt Peak || Spacewatch || HOF || align=right | 4.6 km || 
|-id=108 bgcolor=#E9E9E9
| 97108 ||  || — || November 4, 1999 || Socorro || LINEAR || NEM || align=right | 2.9 km || 
|-id=109 bgcolor=#E9E9E9
| 97109 ||  || — || November 4, 1999 || Socorro || LINEAR || — || align=right | 3.3 km || 
|-id=110 bgcolor=#E9E9E9
| 97110 ||  || — || November 5, 1999 || Socorro || LINEAR || — || align=right | 1.8 km || 
|-id=111 bgcolor=#E9E9E9
| 97111 ||  || — || November 1, 1999 || Kitt Peak || Spacewatch || — || align=right | 4.0 km || 
|-id=112 bgcolor=#E9E9E9
| 97112 ||  || — || November 3, 1999 || Kitt Peak || Spacewatch || — || align=right | 3.7 km || 
|-id=113 bgcolor=#E9E9E9
| 97113 ||  || — || November 5, 1999 || Socorro || LINEAR || — || align=right | 3.3 km || 
|-id=114 bgcolor=#E9E9E9
| 97114 ||  || — || November 4, 1999 || Socorro || LINEAR || — || align=right | 3.3 km || 
|-id=115 bgcolor=#E9E9E9
| 97115 ||  || — || November 5, 1999 || Socorro || LINEAR || — || align=right | 2.0 km || 
|-id=116 bgcolor=#E9E9E9
| 97116 ||  || — || November 5, 1999 || Socorro || LINEAR || — || align=right | 5.7 km || 
|-id=117 bgcolor=#E9E9E9
| 97117 ||  || — || November 9, 1999 || Socorro || LINEAR || — || align=right | 3.3 km || 
|-id=118 bgcolor=#E9E9E9
| 97118 ||  || — || November 9, 1999 || Socorro || LINEAR || AGN || align=right | 2.6 km || 
|-id=119 bgcolor=#E9E9E9
| 97119 ||  || — || November 9, 1999 || Socorro || LINEAR || — || align=right | 3.1 km || 
|-id=120 bgcolor=#E9E9E9
| 97120 ||  || — || November 9, 1999 || Socorro || LINEAR || — || align=right | 2.9 km || 
|-id=121 bgcolor=#E9E9E9
| 97121 ||  || — || November 9, 1999 || Socorro || LINEAR || — || align=right | 1.7 km || 
|-id=122 bgcolor=#d6d6d6
| 97122 ||  || — || November 9, 1999 || Socorro || LINEAR || KOR || align=right | 3.0 km || 
|-id=123 bgcolor=#E9E9E9
| 97123 ||  || — || November 9, 1999 || Socorro || LINEAR || — || align=right | 1.7 km || 
|-id=124 bgcolor=#d6d6d6
| 97124 ||  || — || November 9, 1999 || Socorro || LINEAR || — || align=right | 5.5 km || 
|-id=125 bgcolor=#E9E9E9
| 97125 ||  || — || November 9, 1999 || Socorro || LINEAR || EUN || align=right | 2.3 km || 
|-id=126 bgcolor=#d6d6d6
| 97126 ||  || — || November 9, 1999 || Socorro || LINEAR || EOS || align=right | 3.7 km || 
|-id=127 bgcolor=#d6d6d6
| 97127 ||  || — || November 9, 1999 || Socorro || LINEAR || — || align=right | 6.1 km || 
|-id=128 bgcolor=#E9E9E9
| 97128 ||  || — || November 9, 1999 || Socorro || LINEAR || ADE || align=right | 5.0 km || 
|-id=129 bgcolor=#E9E9E9
| 97129 ||  || — || November 9, 1999 || Socorro || LINEAR || — || align=right | 2.1 km || 
|-id=130 bgcolor=#d6d6d6
| 97130 ||  || — || November 9, 1999 || Socorro || LINEAR || — || align=right | 5.7 km || 
|-id=131 bgcolor=#d6d6d6
| 97131 ||  || — || November 9, 1999 || Socorro || LINEAR || — || align=right | 5.4 km || 
|-id=132 bgcolor=#E9E9E9
| 97132 ||  || — || November 9, 1999 || Catalina || CSS || — || align=right | 4.9 km || 
|-id=133 bgcolor=#E9E9E9
| 97133 ||  || — || November 9, 1999 || Catalina || CSS || MAR || align=right | 2.2 km || 
|-id=134 bgcolor=#E9E9E9
| 97134 ||  || — || November 9, 1999 || Catalina || CSS || — || align=right | 3.2 km || 
|-id=135 bgcolor=#E9E9E9
| 97135 ||  || — || November 9, 1999 || Catalina || CSS || — || align=right | 2.5 km || 
|-id=136 bgcolor=#d6d6d6
| 97136 ||  || — || November 4, 1999 || Kitt Peak || Spacewatch || — || align=right | 3.1 km || 
|-id=137 bgcolor=#d6d6d6
| 97137 ||  || — || November 4, 1999 || Kitt Peak || Spacewatch || KAR || align=right | 2.0 km || 
|-id=138 bgcolor=#d6d6d6
| 97138 ||  || — || November 5, 1999 || Kitt Peak || Spacewatch || — || align=right | 6.6 km || 
|-id=139 bgcolor=#E9E9E9
| 97139 ||  || — || November 11, 1999 || Kitt Peak || Spacewatch || — || align=right | 3.6 km || 
|-id=140 bgcolor=#fefefe
| 97140 ||  || — || November 10, 1999 || Kitt Peak || Spacewatch || — || align=right | 1.6 km || 
|-id=141 bgcolor=#E9E9E9
| 97141 ||  || — || November 10, 1999 || Kitt Peak || Spacewatch || — || align=right | 3.6 km || 
|-id=142 bgcolor=#d6d6d6
| 97142 ||  || — || November 10, 1999 || Kitt Peak || Spacewatch || — || align=right | 5.4 km || 
|-id=143 bgcolor=#E9E9E9
| 97143 ||  || — || November 13, 1999 || Kitt Peak || Spacewatch || — || align=right | 1.8 km || 
|-id=144 bgcolor=#E9E9E9
| 97144 ||  || — || November 14, 1999 || Socorro || LINEAR || — || align=right | 4.2 km || 
|-id=145 bgcolor=#E9E9E9
| 97145 ||  || — || November 13, 1999 || Catalina || CSS || MAR || align=right | 5.8 km || 
|-id=146 bgcolor=#E9E9E9
| 97146 ||  || — || November 14, 1999 || Socorro || LINEAR || — || align=right | 3.0 km || 
|-id=147 bgcolor=#E9E9E9
| 97147 ||  || — || November 14, 1999 || Socorro || LINEAR || — || align=right | 4.2 km || 
|-id=148 bgcolor=#E9E9E9
| 97148 ||  || — || November 9, 1999 || Kitt Peak || Spacewatch || — || align=right | 2.2 km || 
|-id=149 bgcolor=#E9E9E9
| 97149 ||  || — || November 15, 1999 || Kitt Peak || Spacewatch || GEF || align=right | 2.7 km || 
|-id=150 bgcolor=#d6d6d6
| 97150 ||  || — || November 12, 1999 || Socorro || LINEAR || — || align=right | 10 km || 
|-id=151 bgcolor=#E9E9E9
| 97151 ||  || — || November 14, 1999 || Socorro || LINEAR || — || align=right | 2.4 km || 
|-id=152 bgcolor=#E9E9E9
| 97152 ||  || — || November 14, 1999 || Socorro || LINEAR || — || align=right | 4.7 km || 
|-id=153 bgcolor=#E9E9E9
| 97153 ||  || — || November 14, 1999 || Socorro || LINEAR || HOF || align=right | 3.5 km || 
|-id=154 bgcolor=#E9E9E9
| 97154 ||  || — || November 14, 1999 || Socorro || LINEAR || — || align=right | 3.7 km || 
|-id=155 bgcolor=#E9E9E9
| 97155 ||  || — || November 14, 1999 || Socorro || LINEAR || — || align=right | 4.5 km || 
|-id=156 bgcolor=#d6d6d6
| 97156 ||  || — || November 14, 1999 || Socorro || LINEAR || KOR || align=right | 3.3 km || 
|-id=157 bgcolor=#E9E9E9
| 97157 ||  || — || November 14, 1999 || Socorro || LINEAR || fast? || align=right | 3.7 km || 
|-id=158 bgcolor=#E9E9E9
| 97158 ||  || — || November 14, 1999 || Socorro || LINEAR || — || align=right | 2.5 km || 
|-id=159 bgcolor=#d6d6d6
| 97159 ||  || — || November 14, 1999 || Socorro || LINEAR || EOS || align=right | 4.8 km || 
|-id=160 bgcolor=#E9E9E9
| 97160 ||  || — || November 9, 1999 || Socorro || LINEAR || — || align=right | 4.2 km || 
|-id=161 bgcolor=#d6d6d6
| 97161 ||  || — || November 9, 1999 || Socorro || LINEAR || THM || align=right | 4.1 km || 
|-id=162 bgcolor=#E9E9E9
| 97162 ||  || — || November 15, 1999 || Socorro || LINEAR || — || align=right | 4.2 km || 
|-id=163 bgcolor=#d6d6d6
| 97163 ||  || — || November 15, 1999 || Socorro || LINEAR || — || align=right | 9.4 km || 
|-id=164 bgcolor=#d6d6d6
| 97164 ||  || — || November 15, 1999 || Socorro || LINEAR || — || align=right | 6.5 km || 
|-id=165 bgcolor=#E9E9E9
| 97165 ||  || — || November 15, 1999 || Socorro || LINEAR || — || align=right | 2.5 km || 
|-id=166 bgcolor=#fefefe
| 97166 ||  || — || November 15, 1999 || Socorro || LINEAR || NYS || align=right | 3.3 km || 
|-id=167 bgcolor=#E9E9E9
| 97167 ||  || — || November 15, 1999 || Socorro || LINEAR || — || align=right | 5.6 km || 
|-id=168 bgcolor=#d6d6d6
| 97168 ||  || — || November 15, 1999 || Socorro || LINEAR || — || align=right | 5.9 km || 
|-id=169 bgcolor=#E9E9E9
| 97169 ||  || — || November 1, 1999 || Anderson Mesa || LONEOS || — || align=right | 5.3 km || 
|-id=170 bgcolor=#E9E9E9
| 97170 ||  || — || November 1, 1999 || Catalina || CSS || — || align=right | 4.9 km || 
|-id=171 bgcolor=#E9E9E9
| 97171 ||  || — || November 3, 1999 || Catalina || CSS || — || align=right | 2.7 km || 
|-id=172 bgcolor=#E9E9E9
| 97172 ||  || — || November 3, 1999 || Catalina || CSS || — || align=right | 2.0 km || 
|-id=173 bgcolor=#d6d6d6
| 97173 ||  || — || November 3, 1999 || Anderson Mesa || LONEOS || TRP || align=right | 6.9 km || 
|-id=174 bgcolor=#E9E9E9
| 97174 ||  || — || November 2, 1999 || Catalina || CSS || ADE || align=right | 8.2 km || 
|-id=175 bgcolor=#E9E9E9
| 97175 ||  || — || November 9, 1999 || Anderson Mesa || LONEOS || — || align=right | 4.1 km || 
|-id=176 bgcolor=#d6d6d6
| 97176 ||  || — || November 13, 1999 || Catalina || CSS || EOS || align=right | 4.2 km || 
|-id=177 bgcolor=#E9E9E9
| 97177 ||  || — || November 3, 1999 || Socorro || LINEAR || — || align=right | 2.2 km || 
|-id=178 bgcolor=#E9E9E9
| 97178 ||  || — || November 3, 1999 || Socorro || LINEAR || — || align=right | 5.0 km || 
|-id=179 bgcolor=#d6d6d6
| 97179 ||  || — || November 5, 1999 || Socorro || LINEAR || — || align=right | 6.0 km || 
|-id=180 bgcolor=#E9E9E9
| 97180 ||  || — || November 5, 1999 || Socorro || LINEAR || — || align=right | 4.0 km || 
|-id=181 bgcolor=#E9E9E9
| 97181 ||  || — || November 3, 1999 || Socorro || LINEAR || — || align=right | 5.1 km || 
|-id=182 bgcolor=#E9E9E9
| 97182 || 1999 WC || — || November 16, 1999 || Sabino Canyon || J. McGaha || EUN || align=right | 4.4 km || 
|-id=183 bgcolor=#E9E9E9
| 97183 ||  || — || November 25, 1999 || Višnjan Observatory || K. Korlević || HNS || align=right | 2.9 km || 
|-id=184 bgcolor=#d6d6d6
| 97184 ||  || — || November 19, 1999 || Kvistaberg || UDAS || KOR || align=right | 3.0 km || 
|-id=185 bgcolor=#d6d6d6
| 97185 ||  || — || November 28, 1999 || Oizumi || T. Kobayashi || — || align=right | 4.8 km || 
|-id=186 bgcolor=#d6d6d6
| 97186 Tore ||  ||  || November 28, 1999 || Gnosca || S. Sposetti || — || align=right | 6.9 km || 
|-id=187 bgcolor=#E9E9E9
| 97187 ||  || — || November 28, 1999 || Kitt Peak || Spacewatch || — || align=right | 3.3 km || 
|-id=188 bgcolor=#E9E9E9
| 97188 ||  || — || November 28, 1999 || Kitt Peak || Spacewatch || — || align=right | 4.6 km || 
|-id=189 bgcolor=#d6d6d6
| 97189 ||  || — || November 30, 1999 || Kitt Peak || Spacewatch || — || align=right | 4.3 km || 
|-id=190 bgcolor=#E9E9E9
| 97190 ||  || — || November 29, 1999 || Kitt Peak || Spacewatch || — || align=right | 1.5 km || 
|-id=191 bgcolor=#E9E9E9
| 97191 ||  || — || November 29, 1999 || Kitt Peak || Spacewatch || — || align=right | 2.8 km || 
|-id=192 bgcolor=#E9E9E9
| 97192 ||  || — || November 30, 1999 || Kitt Peak || Spacewatch || GEF || align=right | 3.2 km || 
|-id=193 bgcolor=#E9E9E9
| 97193 ||  || — || November 30, 1999 || Kitt Peak || Spacewatch || — || align=right | 2.2 km || 
|-id=194 bgcolor=#E9E9E9
| 97194 ||  || — || November 30, 1999 || Kitt Peak || Spacewatch || — || align=right | 2.2 km || 
|-id=195 bgcolor=#E9E9E9
| 97195 ||  || — || November 30, 1999 || Kitt Peak || Spacewatch || — || align=right | 3.8 km || 
|-id=196 bgcolor=#E9E9E9
| 97196 ||  || — || December 3, 1999 || Prescott || P. G. Comba || — || align=right | 3.5 km || 
|-id=197 bgcolor=#d6d6d6
| 97197 ||  || — || December 4, 1999 || Catalina || CSS || — || align=right | 5.6 km || 
|-id=198 bgcolor=#E9E9E9
| 97198 ||  || — || December 4, 1999 || Catalina || CSS || — || align=right | 3.9 km || 
|-id=199 bgcolor=#E9E9E9
| 97199 ||  || — || December 4, 1999 || Catalina || CSS || — || align=right | 4.1 km || 
|-id=200 bgcolor=#E9E9E9
| 97200 ||  || — || December 3, 1999 || Oizumi || T. Kobayashi || — || align=right | 4.3 km || 
|}

97201–97300 

|-bgcolor=#E9E9E9
| 97201 ||  || — || December 5, 1999 || Socorro || LINEAR || — || align=right | 6.2 km || 
|-id=202 bgcolor=#E9E9E9
| 97202 ||  || — || December 5, 1999 || Catalina || CSS || — || align=right | 4.9 km || 
|-id=203 bgcolor=#fefefe
| 97203 ||  || — || December 6, 1999 || Socorro || LINEAR || H || align=right | 1.8 km || 
|-id=204 bgcolor=#E9E9E9
| 97204 ||  || — || December 5, 1999 || Socorro || LINEAR || — || align=right | 2.8 km || 
|-id=205 bgcolor=#E9E9E9
| 97205 ||  || — || December 5, 1999 || Socorro || LINEAR || — || align=right | 6.6 km || 
|-id=206 bgcolor=#E9E9E9
| 97206 ||  || — || December 6, 1999 || Socorro || LINEAR || — || align=right | 2.7 km || 
|-id=207 bgcolor=#E9E9E9
| 97207 ||  || — || December 6, 1999 || Socorro || LINEAR || HEN || align=right | 2.4 km || 
|-id=208 bgcolor=#fefefe
| 97208 ||  || — || December 6, 1999 || Socorro || LINEAR || H || align=right | 1.2 km || 
|-id=209 bgcolor=#E9E9E9
| 97209 ||  || — || December 7, 1999 || Fountain Hills || C. W. Juels || MAR || align=right | 4.5 km || 
|-id=210 bgcolor=#E9E9E9
| 97210 ||  || — || December 7, 1999 || Fountain Hills || C. W. Juels || — || align=right | 5.3 km || 
|-id=211 bgcolor=#E9E9E9
| 97211 ||  || — || December 7, 1999 || Fountain Hills || C. W. Juels || MAR || align=right | 4.2 km || 
|-id=212 bgcolor=#d6d6d6
| 97212 ||  || — || December 7, 1999 || Campo Catino || Campo Catino Obs. || — || align=right | 3.7 km || 
|-id=213 bgcolor=#d6d6d6
| 97213 ||  || — || December 7, 1999 || Socorro || LINEAR || KOR || align=right | 3.0 km || 
|-id=214 bgcolor=#E9E9E9
| 97214 ||  || — || December 7, 1999 || Socorro || LINEAR || — || align=right | 2.9 km || 
|-id=215 bgcolor=#E9E9E9
| 97215 ||  || — || December 7, 1999 || Socorro || LINEAR || — || align=right | 3.1 km || 
|-id=216 bgcolor=#E9E9E9
| 97216 ||  || — || December 7, 1999 || Socorro || LINEAR || — || align=right | 3.2 km || 
|-id=217 bgcolor=#d6d6d6
| 97217 ||  || — || December 7, 1999 || Socorro || LINEAR || KOR || align=right | 2.8 km || 
|-id=218 bgcolor=#E9E9E9
| 97218 ||  || — || December 7, 1999 || Socorro || LINEAR || XIZ || align=right | 3.3 km || 
|-id=219 bgcolor=#E9E9E9
| 97219 ||  || — || December 7, 1999 || Socorro || LINEAR || — || align=right | 3.8 km || 
|-id=220 bgcolor=#d6d6d6
| 97220 ||  || — || December 7, 1999 || Socorro || LINEAR || — || align=right | 3.3 km || 
|-id=221 bgcolor=#E9E9E9
| 97221 ||  || — || December 7, 1999 || Socorro || LINEAR || — || align=right | 3.8 km || 
|-id=222 bgcolor=#d6d6d6
| 97222 ||  || — || December 7, 1999 || Socorro || LINEAR || — || align=right | 7.1 km || 
|-id=223 bgcolor=#d6d6d6
| 97223 ||  || — || December 7, 1999 || Socorro || LINEAR || — || align=right | 5.4 km || 
|-id=224 bgcolor=#E9E9E9
| 97224 ||  || — || December 7, 1999 || Socorro || LINEAR || — || align=right | 3.1 km || 
|-id=225 bgcolor=#E9E9E9
| 97225 ||  || — || December 7, 1999 || Socorro || LINEAR || — || align=right | 4.5 km || 
|-id=226 bgcolor=#d6d6d6
| 97226 ||  || — || December 7, 1999 || Socorro || LINEAR || — || align=right | 8.4 km || 
|-id=227 bgcolor=#d6d6d6
| 97227 ||  || — || December 7, 1999 || Socorro || LINEAR || EOS || align=right | 5.9 km || 
|-id=228 bgcolor=#d6d6d6
| 97228 ||  || — || December 7, 1999 || Socorro || LINEAR || — || align=right | 7.1 km || 
|-id=229 bgcolor=#d6d6d6
| 97229 ||  || — || December 7, 1999 || Socorro || LINEAR || — || align=right | 7.7 km || 
|-id=230 bgcolor=#E9E9E9
| 97230 ||  || — || December 7, 1999 || Socorro || LINEAR || — || align=right | 4.8 km || 
|-id=231 bgcolor=#E9E9E9
| 97231 ||  || — || December 7, 1999 || Socorro || LINEAR || JUN || align=right | 2.1 km || 
|-id=232 bgcolor=#E9E9E9
| 97232 ||  || — || December 7, 1999 || Socorro || LINEAR || — || align=right | 3.5 km || 
|-id=233 bgcolor=#E9E9E9
| 97233 ||  || — || December 7, 1999 || Socorro || LINEAR || — || align=right | 4.3 km || 
|-id=234 bgcolor=#E9E9E9
| 97234 ||  || — || December 7, 1999 || Socorro || LINEAR || — || align=right | 2.3 km || 
|-id=235 bgcolor=#E9E9E9
| 97235 ||  || — || December 7, 1999 || Socorro || LINEAR || — || align=right | 3.4 km || 
|-id=236 bgcolor=#d6d6d6
| 97236 ||  || — || December 7, 1999 || Socorro || LINEAR || EUP || align=right | 8.6 km || 
|-id=237 bgcolor=#d6d6d6
| 97237 ||  || — || December 7, 1999 || Socorro || LINEAR || HYG || align=right | 7.4 km || 
|-id=238 bgcolor=#E9E9E9
| 97238 ||  || — || December 7, 1999 || Socorro || LINEAR || — || align=right | 2.4 km || 
|-id=239 bgcolor=#d6d6d6
| 97239 ||  || — || December 7, 1999 || Socorro || LINEAR || — || align=right | 2.3 km || 
|-id=240 bgcolor=#d6d6d6
| 97240 ||  || — || December 7, 1999 || Socorro || LINEAR || — || align=right | 8.4 km || 
|-id=241 bgcolor=#E9E9E9
| 97241 ||  || — || December 7, 1999 || Socorro || LINEAR || — || align=right | 3.4 km || 
|-id=242 bgcolor=#E9E9E9
| 97242 ||  || — || December 7, 1999 || Socorro || LINEAR || — || align=right | 3.0 km || 
|-id=243 bgcolor=#d6d6d6
| 97243 ||  || — || December 7, 1999 || Socorro || LINEAR || EOS || align=right | 3.9 km || 
|-id=244 bgcolor=#d6d6d6
| 97244 ||  || — || December 7, 1999 || Socorro || LINEAR || — || align=right | 5.1 km || 
|-id=245 bgcolor=#d6d6d6
| 97245 ||  || — || December 7, 1999 || Socorro || LINEAR || — || align=right | 2.7 km || 
|-id=246 bgcolor=#d6d6d6
| 97246 ||  || — || December 7, 1999 || Socorro || LINEAR || — || align=right | 4.5 km || 
|-id=247 bgcolor=#d6d6d6
| 97247 ||  || — || December 7, 1999 || Socorro || LINEAR || — || align=right | 5.9 km || 
|-id=248 bgcolor=#E9E9E9
| 97248 ||  || — || December 4, 1999 || Catalina || CSS || — || align=right | 4.4 km || 
|-id=249 bgcolor=#E9E9E9
| 97249 ||  || — || December 4, 1999 || Catalina || CSS || — || align=right | 3.6 km || 
|-id=250 bgcolor=#E9E9E9
| 97250 ||  || — || December 4, 1999 || Catalina || CSS || — || align=right | 4.8 km || 
|-id=251 bgcolor=#E9E9E9
| 97251 ||  || — || December 4, 1999 || Catalina || CSS || — || align=right | 5.0 km || 
|-id=252 bgcolor=#E9E9E9
| 97252 ||  || — || December 4, 1999 || Catalina || CSS || — || align=right | 2.8 km || 
|-id=253 bgcolor=#E9E9E9
| 97253 ||  || — || December 4, 1999 || Catalina || CSS || — || align=right | 3.2 km || 
|-id=254 bgcolor=#E9E9E9
| 97254 ||  || — || December 10, 1999 || Socorro || LINEAR || — || align=right | 4.1 km || 
|-id=255 bgcolor=#E9E9E9
| 97255 ||  || — || December 11, 1999 || Socorro || LINEAR || EUN || align=right | 4.7 km || 
|-id=256 bgcolor=#E9E9E9
| 97256 ||  || — || December 11, 1999 || Socorro || LINEAR || MAR || align=right | 3.5 km || 
|-id=257 bgcolor=#fefefe
| 97257 ||  || — || December 12, 1999 || Socorro || LINEAR || H || align=right | 2.9 km || 
|-id=258 bgcolor=#E9E9E9
| 97258 ||  || — || December 5, 1999 || Catalina || CSS || — || align=right | 4.2 km || 
|-id=259 bgcolor=#E9E9E9
| 97259 ||  || — || December 5, 1999 || Catalina || CSS || — || align=right | 3.5 km || 
|-id=260 bgcolor=#E9E9E9
| 97260 ||  || — || December 5, 1999 || Catalina || CSS || DOR || align=right | 6.5 km || 
|-id=261 bgcolor=#E9E9E9
| 97261 ||  || — || December 5, 1999 || Catalina || CSS || — || align=right | 2.6 km || 
|-id=262 bgcolor=#E9E9E9
| 97262 ||  || — || December 6, 1999 || Catalina || CSS || EUN || align=right | 3.2 km || 
|-id=263 bgcolor=#E9E9E9
| 97263 ||  || — || December 7, 1999 || Catalina || CSS || — || align=right | 3.4 km || 
|-id=264 bgcolor=#E9E9E9
| 97264 ||  || — || December 7, 1999 || Catalina || CSS || — || align=right | 5.4 km || 
|-id=265 bgcolor=#d6d6d6
| 97265 ||  || — || December 7, 1999 || Catalina || CSS || — || align=right | 4.7 km || 
|-id=266 bgcolor=#E9E9E9
| 97266 ||  || — || December 7, 1999 || Catalina || CSS || — || align=right | 2.5 km || 
|-id=267 bgcolor=#E9E9E9
| 97267 ||  || — || December 7, 1999 || Catalina || CSS || — || align=right | 5.3 km || 
|-id=268 bgcolor=#E9E9E9
| 97268 Serafinozani ||  ||  || December 7, 1999 || Catalina || CSS || — || align=right | 3.5 km || 
|-id=269 bgcolor=#E9E9E9
| 97269 ||  || — || December 12, 1999 || Socorro || LINEAR || EUN || align=right | 2.8 km || 
|-id=270 bgcolor=#d6d6d6
| 97270 ||  || — || December 15, 1999 || Prescott || P. G. Comba || — || align=right | 6.5 km || 
|-id=271 bgcolor=#E9E9E9
| 97271 ||  || — || December 2, 1999 || Kitt Peak || Spacewatch || — || align=right | 4.5 km || 
|-id=272 bgcolor=#d6d6d6
| 97272 ||  || — || December 2, 1999 || Kitt Peak || Spacewatch || KOR || align=right | 2.3 km || 
|-id=273 bgcolor=#d6d6d6
| 97273 ||  || — || December 2, 1999 || Kitt Peak || Spacewatch || — || align=right | 4.7 km || 
|-id=274 bgcolor=#E9E9E9
| 97274 ||  || — || December 12, 1999 || Socorro || LINEAR || BRU || align=right | 9.6 km || 
|-id=275 bgcolor=#E9E9E9
| 97275 ||  || — || December 13, 1999 || Socorro || LINEAR || — || align=right | 14 km || 
|-id=276 bgcolor=#fefefe
| 97276 ||  || — || December 14, 1999 || Fountain Hills || C. W. Juels || — || align=right | 3.8 km || 
|-id=277 bgcolor=#E9E9E9
| 97277 ||  || — || December 15, 1999 || Fountain Hills || C. W. Juels || — || align=right | 5.8 km || 
|-id=278 bgcolor=#E9E9E9
| 97278 ||  || — || December 15, 1999 || Fountain Hills || C. W. Juels || — || align=right | 9.9 km || 
|-id=279 bgcolor=#d6d6d6
| 97279 ||  || — || December 6, 1999 || Višnjan Observatory || K. Korlević || — || align=right | 8.0 km || 
|-id=280 bgcolor=#E9E9E9
| 97280 ||  || — || December 9, 1999 || Anderson Mesa || LONEOS || — || align=right | 6.7 km || 
|-id=281 bgcolor=#E9E9E9
| 97281 ||  || — || December 9, 1999 || Anderson Mesa || LONEOS || — || align=right | 2.9 km || 
|-id=282 bgcolor=#E9E9E9
| 97282 ||  || — || December 7, 1999 || Socorro || LINEAR || — || align=right | 4.3 km || 
|-id=283 bgcolor=#d6d6d6
| 97283 ||  || — || December 8, 1999 || Socorro || LINEAR || — || align=right | 7.9 km || 
|-id=284 bgcolor=#d6d6d6
| 97284 ||  || — || December 8, 1999 || Socorro || LINEAR || — || align=right | 5.0 km || 
|-id=285 bgcolor=#d6d6d6
| 97285 ||  || — || December 12, 1999 || Socorro || LINEAR || — || align=right | 3.8 km || 
|-id=286 bgcolor=#E9E9E9
| 97286 ||  || — || December 13, 1999 || Socorro || LINEAR || — || align=right | 3.4 km || 
|-id=287 bgcolor=#d6d6d6
| 97287 ||  || — || December 8, 1999 || Kitt Peak || Spacewatch || — || align=right | 5.9 km || 
|-id=288 bgcolor=#d6d6d6
| 97288 ||  || — || December 8, 1999 || Socorro || LINEAR || TIR || align=right | 6.0 km || 
|-id=289 bgcolor=#fefefe
| 97289 ||  || — || December 8, 1999 || Socorro || LINEAR || H || align=right | 1.3 km || 
|-id=290 bgcolor=#E9E9E9
| 97290 ||  || — || December 10, 1999 || Socorro || LINEAR || — || align=right | 4.2 km || 
|-id=291 bgcolor=#d6d6d6
| 97291 ||  || — || December 10, 1999 || Socorro || LINEAR || HYG || align=right | 7.0 km || 
|-id=292 bgcolor=#d6d6d6
| 97292 ||  || — || December 10, 1999 || Socorro || LINEAR || — || align=right | 4.8 km || 
|-id=293 bgcolor=#d6d6d6
| 97293 ||  || — || December 10, 1999 || Socorro || LINEAR || LUT || align=right | 11 km || 
|-id=294 bgcolor=#d6d6d6
| 97294 ||  || — || December 10, 1999 || Socorro || LINEAR || — || align=right | 6.8 km || 
|-id=295 bgcolor=#E9E9E9
| 97295 ||  || — || December 10, 1999 || Socorro || LINEAR || GEF || align=right | 3.2 km || 
|-id=296 bgcolor=#d6d6d6
| 97296 ||  || — || December 10, 1999 || Socorro || LINEAR || — || align=right | 6.8 km || 
|-id=297 bgcolor=#d6d6d6
| 97297 ||  || — || December 10, 1999 || Socorro || LINEAR || — || align=right | 9.7 km || 
|-id=298 bgcolor=#E9E9E9
| 97298 ||  || — || December 12, 1999 || Socorro || LINEAR || GEF || align=right | 2.6 km || 
|-id=299 bgcolor=#E9E9E9
| 97299 ||  || — || December 12, 1999 || Socorro || LINEAR || DOR || align=right | 7.0 km || 
|-id=300 bgcolor=#E9E9E9
| 97300 ||  || — || December 12, 1999 || Socorro || LINEAR || — || align=right | 3.2 km || 
|}

97301–97400 

|-bgcolor=#E9E9E9
| 97301 ||  || — || December 12, 1999 || Socorro || LINEAR || MRX || align=right | 2.1 km || 
|-id=302 bgcolor=#E9E9E9
| 97302 ||  || — || December 12, 1999 || Socorro || LINEAR || PAD || align=right | 3.5 km || 
|-id=303 bgcolor=#E9E9E9
| 97303 ||  || — || December 12, 1999 || Socorro || LINEAR || — || align=right | 5.7 km || 
|-id=304 bgcolor=#d6d6d6
| 97304 ||  || — || December 12, 1999 || Socorro || LINEAR || EOS || align=right | 4.1 km || 
|-id=305 bgcolor=#d6d6d6
| 97305 ||  || — || December 12, 1999 || Socorro || LINEAR || — || align=right | 5.4 km || 
|-id=306 bgcolor=#E9E9E9
| 97306 ||  || — || December 12, 1999 || Socorro || LINEAR || — || align=right | 3.7 km || 
|-id=307 bgcolor=#d6d6d6
| 97307 ||  || — || December 12, 1999 || Socorro || LINEAR || URS || align=right | 9.3 km || 
|-id=308 bgcolor=#d6d6d6
| 97308 ||  || — || December 12, 1999 || Socorro || LINEAR || — || align=right | 6.2 km || 
|-id=309 bgcolor=#E9E9E9
| 97309 ||  || — || December 12, 1999 || Socorro || LINEAR || CLO || align=right | 5.4 km || 
|-id=310 bgcolor=#d6d6d6
| 97310 ||  || — || December 12, 1999 || Socorro || LINEAR || — || align=right | 6.9 km || 
|-id=311 bgcolor=#E9E9E9
| 97311 ||  || — || December 12, 1999 || Socorro || LINEAR || — || align=right | 6.2 km || 
|-id=312 bgcolor=#E9E9E9
| 97312 ||  || — || December 12, 1999 || Socorro || LINEAR || — || align=right | 5.4 km || 
|-id=313 bgcolor=#d6d6d6
| 97313 ||  || — || December 12, 1999 || Socorro || LINEAR || — || align=right | 10 km || 
|-id=314 bgcolor=#d6d6d6
| 97314 ||  || — || December 12, 1999 || Socorro || LINEAR || slow || align=right | 2.9 km || 
|-id=315 bgcolor=#E9E9E9
| 97315 ||  || — || December 13, 1999 || Socorro || LINEAR || MAR || align=right | 2.3 km || 
|-id=316 bgcolor=#d6d6d6
| 97316 ||  || — || December 13, 1999 || Socorro || LINEAR || — || align=right | 7.9 km || 
|-id=317 bgcolor=#d6d6d6
| 97317 ||  || — || December 14, 1999 || Socorro || LINEAR || — || align=right | 7.0 km || 
|-id=318 bgcolor=#E9E9E9
| 97318 ||  || — || December 14, 1999 || Socorro || LINEAR || — || align=right | 4.9 km || 
|-id=319 bgcolor=#d6d6d6
| 97319 ||  || — || December 14, 1999 || Socorro || LINEAR || ALA || align=right | 9.8 km || 
|-id=320 bgcolor=#d6d6d6
| 97320 ||  || — || December 15, 1999 || Kitt Peak || Spacewatch || KOR || align=right | 2.7 km || 
|-id=321 bgcolor=#E9E9E9
| 97321 ||  || — || December 14, 1999 || Socorro || LINEAR || EUN || align=right | 3.7 km || 
|-id=322 bgcolor=#d6d6d6
| 97322 ||  || — || December 8, 1999 || Catalina || CSS || — || align=right | 4.8 km || 
|-id=323 bgcolor=#d6d6d6
| 97323 ||  || — || December 14, 1999 || Kitt Peak || Spacewatch || THM || align=right | 3.6 km || 
|-id=324 bgcolor=#d6d6d6
| 97324 ||  || — || December 4, 1999 || Catalina || CSS || — || align=right | 4.2 km || 
|-id=325 bgcolor=#E9E9E9
| 97325 ||  || — || December 13, 1999 || Anderson Mesa || LONEOS || GEF || align=right | 2.6 km || 
|-id=326 bgcolor=#E9E9E9
| 97326 ||  || — || December 13, 1999 || Anderson Mesa || LONEOS || — || align=right | 3.3 km || 
|-id=327 bgcolor=#E9E9E9
| 97327 ||  || — || December 13, 1999 || Catalina || CSS || GEF || align=right | 2.5 km || 
|-id=328 bgcolor=#d6d6d6
| 97328 ||  || — || December 12, 1999 || Socorro || LINEAR || — || align=right | 5.9 km || 
|-id=329 bgcolor=#d6d6d6
| 97329 ||  || — || December 3, 1999 || Anderson Mesa || LONEOS || — || align=right | 12 km || 
|-id=330 bgcolor=#d6d6d6
| 97330 ||  || — || December 5, 1999 || Socorro || LINEAR || — || align=right | 8.2 km || 
|-id=331 bgcolor=#d6d6d6
| 97331 ||  || — || December 5, 1999 || Socorro || LINEAR || EOS || align=right | 3.9 km || 
|-id=332 bgcolor=#d6d6d6
| 97332 ||  || — || December 6, 1999 || Socorro || LINEAR || EOS || align=right | 4.3 km || 
|-id=333 bgcolor=#d6d6d6
| 97333 ||  || — || December 7, 1999 || Catalina || CSS || EUP || align=right | 12 km || 
|-id=334 bgcolor=#d6d6d6
| 97334 ||  || — || December 7, 1999 || Catalina || CSS || EOS || align=right | 5.0 km || 
|-id=335 bgcolor=#fefefe
| 97335 || 1999 YF || — || December 16, 1999 || Socorro || LINEAR || H || align=right | 1.3 km || 
|-id=336 bgcolor=#fefefe
| 97336 Thomasafleming ||  ||  || December 16, 1999 || Grasslands || J. McGaha || — || align=right | 1.8 km || 
|-id=337 bgcolor=#E9E9E9
| 97337 ||  || — || December 17, 1999 || Socorro || LINEAR || — || align=right | 6.8 km || 
|-id=338 bgcolor=#d6d6d6
| 97338 ||  || — || December 27, 1999 || Kitt Peak || Spacewatch || — || align=right | 6.8 km || 
|-id=339 bgcolor=#d6d6d6
| 97339 ||  || — || December 30, 1999 || Socorro || LINEAR || — || align=right | 6.4 km || 
|-id=340 bgcolor=#E9E9E9
| 97340 ||  || — || December 30, 1999 || Socorro || LINEAR || — || align=right | 5.5 km || 
|-id=341 bgcolor=#d6d6d6
| 97341 ||  || — || January 2, 2000 || Višnjan Observatory || K. Korlević || — || align=right | 4.3 km || 
|-id=342 bgcolor=#fefefe
| 97342 ||  || — || January 3, 2000 || Socorro || LINEAR || H || align=right | 1.4 km || 
|-id=343 bgcolor=#E9E9E9
| 97343 ||  || — || January 2, 2000 || Socorro || LINEAR || — || align=right | 2.5 km || 
|-id=344 bgcolor=#d6d6d6
| 97344 ||  || — || January 2, 2000 || Socorro || LINEAR || — || align=right | 9.0 km || 
|-id=345 bgcolor=#d6d6d6
| 97345 ||  || — || January 2, 2000 || Socorro || LINEAR || HYG || align=right | 6.9 km || 
|-id=346 bgcolor=#E9E9E9
| 97346 ||  || — || January 3, 2000 || Socorro || LINEAR || ADE || align=right | 10 km || 
|-id=347 bgcolor=#d6d6d6
| 97347 ||  || — || January 3, 2000 || Socorro || LINEAR || — || align=right | 6.3 km || 
|-id=348 bgcolor=#E9E9E9
| 97348 ||  || — || January 3, 2000 || Socorro || LINEAR || — || align=right | 2.5 km || 
|-id=349 bgcolor=#d6d6d6
| 97349 ||  || — || January 3, 2000 || Socorro || LINEAR || THM || align=right | 5.5 km || 
|-id=350 bgcolor=#d6d6d6
| 97350 ||  || — || January 3, 2000 || Socorro || LINEAR || — || align=right | 4.0 km || 
|-id=351 bgcolor=#d6d6d6
| 97351 ||  || — || January 3, 2000 || Socorro || LINEAR || — || align=right | 6.0 km || 
|-id=352 bgcolor=#d6d6d6
| 97352 ||  || — || January 3, 2000 || Socorro || LINEAR || — || align=right | 8.8 km || 
|-id=353 bgcolor=#d6d6d6
| 97353 ||  || — || January 3, 2000 || Socorro || LINEAR || NAE || align=right | 7.4 km || 
|-id=354 bgcolor=#d6d6d6
| 97354 ||  || — || January 3, 2000 || Socorro || LINEAR || — || align=right | 3.9 km || 
|-id=355 bgcolor=#d6d6d6
| 97355 ||  || — || January 3, 2000 || Socorro || LINEAR || — || align=right | 4.7 km || 
|-id=356 bgcolor=#d6d6d6
| 97356 ||  || — || January 5, 2000 || Sormano || A. Testa, P. Chiavenna || KAR || align=right | 2.6 km || 
|-id=357 bgcolor=#d6d6d6
| 97357 ||  || — || January 3, 2000 || Socorro || LINEAR || — || align=right | 5.4 km || 
|-id=358 bgcolor=#d6d6d6
| 97358 ||  || — || January 3, 2000 || Socorro || LINEAR || EOS || align=right | 4.5 km || 
|-id=359 bgcolor=#d6d6d6
| 97359 ||  || — || January 3, 2000 || Socorro || LINEAR || — || align=right | 8.0 km || 
|-id=360 bgcolor=#d6d6d6
| 97360 ||  || — || January 3, 2000 || Socorro || LINEAR || HYG || align=right | 7.5 km || 
|-id=361 bgcolor=#d6d6d6
| 97361 ||  || — || January 3, 2000 || Socorro || LINEAR || — || align=right | 5.0 km || 
|-id=362 bgcolor=#d6d6d6
| 97362 ||  || — || January 3, 2000 || Socorro || LINEAR || — || align=right | 7.8 km || 
|-id=363 bgcolor=#d6d6d6
| 97363 ||  || — || January 3, 2000 || Socorro || LINEAR || — || align=right | 6.8 km || 
|-id=364 bgcolor=#E9E9E9
| 97364 ||  || — || January 5, 2000 || Socorro || LINEAR || — || align=right | 7.1 km || 
|-id=365 bgcolor=#E9E9E9
| 97365 ||  || — || January 5, 2000 || Socorro || LINEAR || — || align=right | 3.8 km || 
|-id=366 bgcolor=#E9E9E9
| 97366 ||  || — || January 4, 2000 || Socorro || LINEAR || CLO || align=right | 4.9 km || 
|-id=367 bgcolor=#E9E9E9
| 97367 ||  || — || January 4, 2000 || Socorro || LINEAR || — || align=right | 2.6 km || 
|-id=368 bgcolor=#E9E9E9
| 97368 ||  || — || January 4, 2000 || Socorro || LINEAR || ADE || align=right | 5.2 km || 
|-id=369 bgcolor=#d6d6d6
| 97369 ||  || — || January 4, 2000 || Socorro || LINEAR || THM || align=right | 6.0 km || 
|-id=370 bgcolor=#d6d6d6
| 97370 ||  || — || January 4, 2000 || Socorro || LINEAR || — || align=right | 8.0 km || 
|-id=371 bgcolor=#fefefe
| 97371 ||  || — || January 4, 2000 || Socorro || LINEAR || FLO || align=right | 3.9 km || 
|-id=372 bgcolor=#d6d6d6
| 97372 ||  || — || January 4, 2000 || Socorro || LINEAR || — || align=right | 5.1 km || 
|-id=373 bgcolor=#d6d6d6
| 97373 ||  || — || January 4, 2000 || Socorro || LINEAR || — || align=right | 2.6 km || 
|-id=374 bgcolor=#d6d6d6
| 97374 ||  || — || January 4, 2000 || Socorro || LINEAR || — || align=right | 4.7 km || 
|-id=375 bgcolor=#d6d6d6
| 97375 ||  || — || January 4, 2000 || Socorro || LINEAR || — || align=right | 4.7 km || 
|-id=376 bgcolor=#d6d6d6
| 97376 ||  || — || January 4, 2000 || Socorro || LINEAR || THM || align=right | 5.5 km || 
|-id=377 bgcolor=#d6d6d6
| 97377 ||  || — || January 4, 2000 || Socorro || LINEAR || EOS || align=right | 4.1 km || 
|-id=378 bgcolor=#d6d6d6
| 97378 ||  || — || January 4, 2000 || Socorro || LINEAR || — || align=right | 5.2 km || 
|-id=379 bgcolor=#E9E9E9
| 97379 ||  || — || January 5, 2000 || Socorro || LINEAR || — || align=right | 6.8 km || 
|-id=380 bgcolor=#d6d6d6
| 97380 ||  || — || January 5, 2000 || Socorro || LINEAR || TIR || align=right | 8.7 km || 
|-id=381 bgcolor=#d6d6d6
| 97381 ||  || — || January 5, 2000 || Socorro || LINEAR || — || align=right | 2.8 km || 
|-id=382 bgcolor=#E9E9E9
| 97382 ||  || — || January 5, 2000 || Socorro || LINEAR || — || align=right | 3.9 km || 
|-id=383 bgcolor=#d6d6d6
| 97383 ||  || — || January 5, 2000 || Socorro || LINEAR || — || align=right | 6.1 km || 
|-id=384 bgcolor=#d6d6d6
| 97384 ||  || — || January 5, 2000 || Socorro || LINEAR || — || align=right | 6.2 km || 
|-id=385 bgcolor=#d6d6d6
| 97385 ||  || — || January 5, 2000 || Socorro || LINEAR || HYG || align=right | 6.3 km || 
|-id=386 bgcolor=#E9E9E9
| 97386 ||  || — || January 5, 2000 || Socorro || LINEAR || — || align=right | 2.7 km || 
|-id=387 bgcolor=#d6d6d6
| 97387 ||  || — || January 5, 2000 || Socorro || LINEAR || EOS || align=right | 4.8 km || 
|-id=388 bgcolor=#E9E9E9
| 97388 ||  || — || January 5, 2000 || Socorro || LINEAR || GEF || align=right | 2.8 km || 
|-id=389 bgcolor=#d6d6d6
| 97389 ||  || — || January 4, 2000 || Socorro || LINEAR || — || align=right | 4.9 km || 
|-id=390 bgcolor=#E9E9E9
| 97390 ||  || — || January 5, 2000 || Socorro || LINEAR || — || align=right | 3.0 km || 
|-id=391 bgcolor=#E9E9E9
| 97391 ||  || — || January 5, 2000 || Socorro || LINEAR || — || align=right | 2.8 km || 
|-id=392 bgcolor=#E9E9E9
| 97392 ||  || — || January 5, 2000 || Socorro || LINEAR || — || align=right | 3.7 km || 
|-id=393 bgcolor=#E9E9E9
| 97393 ||  || — || January 5, 2000 || Socorro || LINEAR || MAR || align=right | 2.5 km || 
|-id=394 bgcolor=#E9E9E9
| 97394 ||  || — || January 5, 2000 || Socorro || LINEAR || — || align=right | 3.5 km || 
|-id=395 bgcolor=#E9E9E9
| 97395 ||  || — || January 5, 2000 || Socorro || LINEAR || — || align=right | 3.8 km || 
|-id=396 bgcolor=#d6d6d6
| 97396 ||  || — || January 5, 2000 || Socorro || LINEAR || — || align=right | 5.0 km || 
|-id=397 bgcolor=#d6d6d6
| 97397 ||  || — || January 5, 2000 || Socorro || LINEAR || — || align=right | 7.4 km || 
|-id=398 bgcolor=#d6d6d6
| 97398 ||  || — || January 5, 2000 || Socorro || LINEAR || — || align=right | 4.0 km || 
|-id=399 bgcolor=#d6d6d6
| 97399 ||  || — || January 5, 2000 || Socorro || LINEAR || — || align=right | 11 km || 
|-id=400 bgcolor=#E9E9E9
| 97400 ||  || — || January 5, 2000 || Socorro || LINEAR || DOR || align=right | 6.4 km || 
|}

97401–97500 

|-bgcolor=#d6d6d6
| 97401 ||  || — || January 5, 2000 || Socorro || LINEAR || ALA || align=right | 11 km || 
|-id=402 bgcolor=#d6d6d6
| 97402 ||  || — || January 5, 2000 || Socorro || LINEAR || HYG || align=right | 5.9 km || 
|-id=403 bgcolor=#d6d6d6
| 97403 ||  || — || January 2, 2000 || Socorro || LINEAR || — || align=right | 3.0 km || 
|-id=404 bgcolor=#d6d6d6
| 97404 ||  || — || January 3, 2000 || Socorro || LINEAR || — || align=right | 7.7 km || 
|-id=405 bgcolor=#d6d6d6
| 97405 ||  || — || January 4, 2000 || Socorro || LINEAR || — || align=right | 3.0 km || 
|-id=406 bgcolor=#d6d6d6
| 97406 ||  || — || January 4, 2000 || Socorro || LINEAR || — || align=right | 7.0 km || 
|-id=407 bgcolor=#E9E9E9
| 97407 ||  || — || January 5, 2000 || Socorro || LINEAR || — || align=right | 2.8 km || 
|-id=408 bgcolor=#E9E9E9
| 97408 ||  || — || January 5, 2000 || Socorro || LINEAR || — || align=right | 3.6 km || 
|-id=409 bgcolor=#E9E9E9
| 97409 ||  || — || January 5, 2000 || Socorro || LINEAR || — || align=right | 3.2 km || 
|-id=410 bgcolor=#E9E9E9
| 97410 ||  || — || January 7, 2000 || Socorro || LINEAR || CLO || align=right | 4.3 km || 
|-id=411 bgcolor=#E9E9E9
| 97411 ||  || — || January 8, 2000 || Socorro || LINEAR || EUN || align=right | 4.4 km || 
|-id=412 bgcolor=#E9E9E9
| 97412 ||  || — || January 2, 2000 || Socorro || LINEAR || HNS || align=right | 3.1 km || 
|-id=413 bgcolor=#d6d6d6
| 97413 ||  || — || January 2, 2000 || Socorro || LINEAR || EOS || align=right | 5.1 km || 
|-id=414 bgcolor=#E9E9E9
| 97414 ||  || — || January 2, 2000 || Socorro || LINEAR || — || align=right | 5.3 km || 
|-id=415 bgcolor=#fefefe
| 97415 ||  || — || January 3, 2000 || Socorro || LINEAR || H || align=right | 1.1 km || 
|-id=416 bgcolor=#d6d6d6
| 97416 ||  || — || January 3, 2000 || Socorro || LINEAR || — || align=right | 8.8 km || 
|-id=417 bgcolor=#E9E9E9
| 97417 ||  || — || January 4, 2000 || Socorro || LINEAR || — || align=right | 6.0 km || 
|-id=418 bgcolor=#d6d6d6
| 97418 ||  || — || January 4, 2000 || Socorro || LINEAR || — || align=right | 5.5 km || 
|-id=419 bgcolor=#E9E9E9
| 97419 ||  || — || January 7, 2000 || Socorro || LINEAR || — || align=right | 3.0 km || 
|-id=420 bgcolor=#d6d6d6
| 97420 ||  || — || January 7, 2000 || Socorro || LINEAR || — || align=right | 3.7 km || 
|-id=421 bgcolor=#E9E9E9
| 97421 ||  || — || January 7, 2000 || Socorro || LINEAR || DOR || align=right | 4.8 km || 
|-id=422 bgcolor=#E9E9E9
| 97422 ||  || — || January 8, 2000 || Socorro || LINEAR || GEF || align=right | 3.0 km || 
|-id=423 bgcolor=#E9E9E9
| 97423 ||  || — || January 8, 2000 || Socorro || LINEAR || — || align=right | 3.6 km || 
|-id=424 bgcolor=#E9E9E9
| 97424 ||  || — || January 8, 2000 || Socorro || LINEAR || — || align=right | 4.5 km || 
|-id=425 bgcolor=#E9E9E9
| 97425 ||  || — || January 8, 2000 || Socorro || LINEAR || — || align=right | 6.3 km || 
|-id=426 bgcolor=#d6d6d6
| 97426 ||  || — || January 8, 2000 || Socorro || LINEAR || — || align=right | 7.4 km || 
|-id=427 bgcolor=#E9E9E9
| 97427 ||  || — || January 9, 2000 || Socorro || LINEAR || — || align=right | 3.1 km || 
|-id=428 bgcolor=#E9E9E9
| 97428 ||  || — || January 9, 2000 || Socorro || LINEAR || — || align=right | 5.1 km || 
|-id=429 bgcolor=#fefefe
| 97429 ||  || — || January 9, 2000 || Socorro || LINEAR || H || align=right | 1.0 km || 
|-id=430 bgcolor=#d6d6d6
| 97430 ||  || — || January 10, 2000 || Socorro || LINEAR || — || align=right | 6.4 km || 
|-id=431 bgcolor=#d6d6d6
| 97431 ||  || — || January 8, 2000 || Socorro || LINEAR || — || align=right | 6.7 km || 
|-id=432 bgcolor=#d6d6d6
| 97432 ||  || — || January 10, 2000 || Kitt Peak || Spacewatch || ALA || align=right | 8.0 km || 
|-id=433 bgcolor=#E9E9E9
| 97433 ||  || — || January 3, 2000 || Socorro || LINEAR || — || align=right | 3.4 km || 
|-id=434 bgcolor=#d6d6d6
| 97434 ||  || — || January 5, 2000 || Socorro || LINEAR || HYG || align=right | 7.0 km || 
|-id=435 bgcolor=#d6d6d6
| 97435 ||  || — || January 5, 2000 || Anderson Mesa || LONEOS || — || align=right | 4.4 km || 
|-id=436 bgcolor=#E9E9E9
| 97436 ||  || — || January 6, 2000 || Anderson Mesa || LONEOS || EUN || align=right | 3.8 km || 
|-id=437 bgcolor=#d6d6d6
| 97437 ||  || — || January 6, 2000 || Socorro || LINEAR || — || align=right | 6.8 km || 
|-id=438 bgcolor=#E9E9E9
| 97438 ||  || — || January 8, 2000 || Socorro || LINEAR || — || align=right | 3.2 km || 
|-id=439 bgcolor=#E9E9E9
| 97439 ||  || — || January 2, 2000 || Socorro || LINEAR || — || align=right | 4.3 km || 
|-id=440 bgcolor=#d6d6d6
| 97440 ||  || — || January 4, 2000 || Kitt Peak || Spacewatch || — || align=right | 3.6 km || 
|-id=441 bgcolor=#d6d6d6
| 97441 ||  || — || January 28, 2000 || Kitt Peak || Spacewatch || — || align=right | 6.2 km || 
|-id=442 bgcolor=#E9E9E9
| 97442 ||  || — || January 29, 2000 || Socorro || LINEAR || — || align=right | 3.1 km || 
|-id=443 bgcolor=#d6d6d6
| 97443 ||  || — || January 30, 2000 || Socorro || LINEAR || HYG || align=right | 6.0 km || 
|-id=444 bgcolor=#fefefe
| 97444 ||  || — || January 28, 2000 || Kitt Peak || Spacewatch || — || align=right | 1.8 km || 
|-id=445 bgcolor=#d6d6d6
| 97445 ||  || — || January 29, 2000 || Kitt Peak || Spacewatch || EOS || align=right | 3.4 km || 
|-id=446 bgcolor=#E9E9E9
| 97446 ||  || — || January 30, 2000 || Socorro || LINEAR || — || align=right | 3.2 km || 
|-id=447 bgcolor=#d6d6d6
| 97447 ||  || — || January 27, 2000 || Kitt Peak || Spacewatch || — || align=right | 9.3 km || 
|-id=448 bgcolor=#d6d6d6
| 97448 ||  || — || January 30, 2000 || Catalina || CSS || EOS || align=right | 4.0 km || 
|-id=449 bgcolor=#d6d6d6
| 97449 ||  || — || January 27, 2000 || Kitt Peak || Spacewatch || KOR || align=right | 2.7 km || 
|-id=450 bgcolor=#d6d6d6
| 97450 ||  || — || January 27, 2000 || Kitt Peak || Spacewatch || — || align=right | 3.6 km || 
|-id=451 bgcolor=#d6d6d6
| 97451 || 2000 CA || — || February 1, 2000 || Oizumi || T. Kobayashi || — || align=right | 7.8 km || 
|-id=452 bgcolor=#fefefe
| 97452 ||  || — || February 2, 2000 || Socorro || LINEAR || H || align=right | 1.1 km || 
|-id=453 bgcolor=#d6d6d6
| 97453 ||  || — || February 2, 2000 || Socorro || LINEAR || URS || align=right | 7.1 km || 
|-id=454 bgcolor=#E9E9E9
| 97454 ||  || — || February 2, 2000 || Socorro || LINEAR || — || align=right | 3.5 km || 
|-id=455 bgcolor=#d6d6d6
| 97455 ||  || — || February 2, 2000 || Socorro || LINEAR || THM || align=right | 6.9 km || 
|-id=456 bgcolor=#d6d6d6
| 97456 ||  || — || February 2, 2000 || Socorro || LINEAR || — || align=right | 6.9 km || 
|-id=457 bgcolor=#d6d6d6
| 97457 ||  || — || February 2, 2000 || Socorro || LINEAR || — || align=right | 6.5 km || 
|-id=458 bgcolor=#d6d6d6
| 97458 ||  || — || February 2, 2000 || Socorro || LINEAR || — || align=right | 3.0 km || 
|-id=459 bgcolor=#d6d6d6
| 97459 ||  || — || February 2, 2000 || Socorro || LINEAR || — || align=right | 5.0 km || 
|-id=460 bgcolor=#d6d6d6
| 97460 ||  || — || February 2, 2000 || Socorro || LINEAR || — || align=right | 4.4 km || 
|-id=461 bgcolor=#d6d6d6
| 97461 ||  || — || February 2, 2000 || Socorro || LINEAR || — || align=right | 5.1 km || 
|-id=462 bgcolor=#d6d6d6
| 97462 ||  || — || February 2, 2000 || Socorro || LINEAR || — || align=right | 5.3 km || 
|-id=463 bgcolor=#d6d6d6
| 97463 ||  || — || February 2, 2000 || Socorro || LINEAR || — || align=right | 3.6 km || 
|-id=464 bgcolor=#d6d6d6
| 97464 ||  || — || February 2, 2000 || Socorro || LINEAR || HYG || align=right | 5.6 km || 
|-id=465 bgcolor=#d6d6d6
| 97465 ||  || — || February 2, 2000 || Socorro || LINEAR || — || align=right | 4.5 km || 
|-id=466 bgcolor=#d6d6d6
| 97466 ||  || — || February 2, 2000 || Socorro || LINEAR || EOS || align=right | 4.6 km || 
|-id=467 bgcolor=#d6d6d6
| 97467 ||  || — || February 5, 2000 || Olathe || L. Robinson || — || align=right | 6.2 km || 
|-id=468 bgcolor=#d6d6d6
| 97468 ||  || — || February 2, 2000 || Socorro || LINEAR || — || align=right | 5.3 km || 
|-id=469 bgcolor=#d6d6d6
| 97469 ||  || — || February 3, 2000 || Socorro || LINEAR || — || align=right | 6.2 km || 
|-id=470 bgcolor=#fefefe
| 97470 ||  || — || February 2, 2000 || Socorro || LINEAR || H || align=right | 1.3 km || 
|-id=471 bgcolor=#d6d6d6
| 97471 ||  || — || February 1, 2000 || Catalina || CSS || — || align=right | 6.0 km || 
|-id=472 bgcolor=#d6d6d6
| 97472 Hobby ||  ||  || February 6, 2000 || Needville || Needville Obs. || LIX || align=right | 5.3 km || 
|-id=473 bgcolor=#d6d6d6
| 97473 ||  || — || February 2, 2000 || Socorro || LINEAR || — || align=right | 4.2 km || 
|-id=474 bgcolor=#d6d6d6
| 97474 ||  || — || February 2, 2000 || Socorro || LINEAR || — || align=right | 5.2 km || 
|-id=475 bgcolor=#d6d6d6
| 97475 ||  || — || February 2, 2000 || Socorro || LINEAR || — || align=right | 4.0 km || 
|-id=476 bgcolor=#d6d6d6
| 97476 ||  || — || February 2, 2000 || Socorro || LINEAR || — || align=right | 6.4 km || 
|-id=477 bgcolor=#d6d6d6
| 97477 ||  || — || February 2, 2000 || Socorro || LINEAR || — || align=right | 5.8 km || 
|-id=478 bgcolor=#d6d6d6
| 97478 ||  || — || February 2, 2000 || Socorro || LINEAR || EOS || align=right | 6.2 km || 
|-id=479 bgcolor=#d6d6d6
| 97479 ||  || — || February 4, 2000 || Socorro || LINEAR || — || align=right | 7.7 km || 
|-id=480 bgcolor=#fefefe
| 97480 ||  || — || February 6, 2000 || Socorro || LINEAR || H || align=right | 1.6 km || 
|-id=481 bgcolor=#d6d6d6
| 97481 ||  || — || February 2, 2000 || Socorro || LINEAR || — || align=right | 6.1 km || 
|-id=482 bgcolor=#d6d6d6
| 97482 ||  || — || February 2, 2000 || Socorro || LINEAR || — || align=right | 4.1 km || 
|-id=483 bgcolor=#d6d6d6
| 97483 ||  || — || February 3, 2000 || Socorro || LINEAR || — || align=right | 4.4 km || 
|-id=484 bgcolor=#d6d6d6
| 97484 ||  || — || February 3, 2000 || Socorro || LINEAR || — || align=right | 4.9 km || 
|-id=485 bgcolor=#E9E9E9
| 97485 ||  || — || February 6, 2000 || Socorro || LINEAR || — || align=right | 2.4 km || 
|-id=486 bgcolor=#d6d6d6
| 97486 ||  || — || February 7, 2000 || Socorro || LINEAR || — || align=right | 3.9 km || 
|-id=487 bgcolor=#d6d6d6
| 97487 ||  || — || February 7, 2000 || Socorro || LINEAR || — || align=right | 6.9 km || 
|-id=488 bgcolor=#d6d6d6
| 97488 ||  || — || February 5, 2000 || Višnjan Observatory || K. Korlević || ALA || align=right | 7.9 km || 
|-id=489 bgcolor=#d6d6d6
| 97489 ||  || — || February 10, 2000 || Višnjan Observatory || K. Korlević || — || align=right | 7.2 km || 
|-id=490 bgcolor=#d6d6d6
| 97490 ||  || — || February 8, 2000 || Kitt Peak || Spacewatch || — || align=right | 4.6 km || 
|-id=491 bgcolor=#fefefe
| 97491 ||  || — || February 8, 2000 || Kitt Peak || Spacewatch || MAS || align=right | 1.3 km || 
|-id=492 bgcolor=#fefefe
| 97492 ||  || — || February 4, 2000 || Socorro || LINEAR || — || align=right | 1.8 km || 
|-id=493 bgcolor=#d6d6d6
| 97493 ||  || — || February 4, 2000 || Socorro || LINEAR || THM || align=right | 4.5 km || 
|-id=494 bgcolor=#d6d6d6
| 97494 ||  || — || February 4, 2000 || Socorro || LINEAR || — || align=right | 8.5 km || 
|-id=495 bgcolor=#d6d6d6
| 97495 ||  || — || February 4, 2000 || Socorro || LINEAR || HYG || align=right | 6.0 km || 
|-id=496 bgcolor=#d6d6d6
| 97496 ||  || — || February 4, 2000 || Socorro || LINEAR || ALA || align=right | 9.2 km || 
|-id=497 bgcolor=#fefefe
| 97497 ||  || — || February 4, 2000 || Socorro || LINEAR || FLO || align=right | 1.6 km || 
|-id=498 bgcolor=#d6d6d6
| 97498 ||  || — || February 5, 2000 || Socorro || LINEAR || — || align=right | 6.9 km || 
|-id=499 bgcolor=#d6d6d6
| 97499 ||  || — || February 6, 2000 || Socorro || LINEAR || — || align=right | 3.9 km || 
|-id=500 bgcolor=#d6d6d6
| 97500 ||  || — || February 6, 2000 || Socorro || LINEAR || — || align=right | 4.4 km || 
|}

97501–97600 

|-bgcolor=#d6d6d6
| 97501 ||  || — || February 6, 2000 || Socorro || LINEAR || — || align=right | 7.9 km || 
|-id=502 bgcolor=#d6d6d6
| 97502 ||  || — || February 6, 2000 || Socorro || LINEAR || — || align=right | 3.0 km || 
|-id=503 bgcolor=#d6d6d6
| 97503 ||  || — || February 8, 2000 || Socorro || LINEAR || EOS || align=right | 5.7 km || 
|-id=504 bgcolor=#d6d6d6
| 97504 ||  || — || February 13, 2000 || Oaxaca || J. M. Roe || EUP || align=right | 7.1 km || 
|-id=505 bgcolor=#d6d6d6
| 97505 ||  || — || February 10, 2000 || Kitt Peak || Spacewatch || — || align=right | 4.4 km || 
|-id=506 bgcolor=#d6d6d6
| 97506 ||  || — || February 10, 2000 || Kitt Peak || Spacewatch || — || align=right | 3.6 km || 
|-id=507 bgcolor=#E9E9E9
| 97507 ||  || — || February 8, 2000 || Socorro || LINEAR || — || align=right | 7.1 km || 
|-id=508 bgcolor=#d6d6d6
| 97508 Bolden ||  ||  || February 6, 2000 || Kitt Peak || M. W. Buie || — || align=right | 5.7 km || 
|-id=509 bgcolor=#d6d6d6
| 97509 ||  || — || February 7, 2000 || Catalina || CSS || — || align=right | 4.5 km || 
|-id=510 bgcolor=#d6d6d6
| 97510 ||  || — || February 7, 2000 || Kitt Peak || Spacewatch || — || align=right | 5.0 km || 
|-id=511 bgcolor=#d6d6d6
| 97511 ||  || — || February 3, 2000 || Socorro || LINEAR || — || align=right | 4.5 km || 
|-id=512 bgcolor=#d6d6d6
| 97512 Jemison ||  ||  || February 5, 2000 || Kitt Peak || M. W. Buie || KOR || align=right | 2.7 km || 
|-id=513 bgcolor=#d6d6d6
| 97513 ||  || — || February 4, 2000 || Kitt Peak || Spacewatch || KOR || align=right | 2.9 km || 
|-id=514 bgcolor=#FA8072
| 97514 ||  || — || February 25, 2000 || Socorro || LINEAR || — || align=right | 9.0 km || 
|-id=515 bgcolor=#fefefe
| 97515 ||  || — || February 26, 2000 || Socorro || LINEAR || H || align=right | 1.3 km || 
|-id=516 bgcolor=#d6d6d6
| 97516 ||  || — || February 27, 2000 || Socorro || LINEAR || ALA || align=right | 11 km || 
|-id=517 bgcolor=#fefefe
| 97517 ||  || — || February 26, 2000 || Socorro || LINEAR || H || align=right | 1.7 km || 
|-id=518 bgcolor=#d6d6d6
| 97518 ||  || — || February 28, 2000 || Socorro || LINEAR || — || align=right | 5.8 km || 
|-id=519 bgcolor=#d6d6d6
| 97519 ||  || — || February 29, 2000 || Višnjan Observatory || K. Korlević || — || align=right | 6.1 km || 
|-id=520 bgcolor=#d6d6d6
| 97520 ||  || — || February 25, 2000 || Siding Spring || R. H. McNaught || — || align=right | 5.3 km || 
|-id=521 bgcolor=#E9E9E9
| 97521 ||  || — || February 28, 2000 || Socorro || LINEAR || EUN || align=right | 2.9 km || 
|-id=522 bgcolor=#d6d6d6
| 97522 ||  || — || February 29, 2000 || Socorro || LINEAR || THM || align=right | 4.6 km || 
|-id=523 bgcolor=#d6d6d6
| 97523 ||  || — || February 29, 2000 || Socorro || LINEAR || — || align=right | 3.9 km || 
|-id=524 bgcolor=#d6d6d6
| 97524 ||  || — || February 29, 2000 || Socorro || LINEAR || — || align=right | 5.9 km || 
|-id=525 bgcolor=#d6d6d6
| 97525 ||  || — || February 29, 2000 || Socorro || LINEAR || — || align=right | 4.1 km || 
|-id=526 bgcolor=#d6d6d6
| 97526 ||  || — || February 29, 2000 || Socorro || LINEAR || — || align=right | 6.9 km || 
|-id=527 bgcolor=#d6d6d6
| 97527 ||  || — || February 29, 2000 || Socorro || LINEAR || — || align=right | 6.8 km || 
|-id=528 bgcolor=#d6d6d6
| 97528 ||  || — || February 29, 2000 || Socorro || LINEAR || EOS || align=right | 4.9 km || 
|-id=529 bgcolor=#d6d6d6
| 97529 ||  || — || February 29, 2000 || Socorro || LINEAR || EOS || align=right | 4.7 km || 
|-id=530 bgcolor=#d6d6d6
| 97530 ||  || — || February 29, 2000 || Socorro || LINEAR || THM || align=right | 5.6 km || 
|-id=531 bgcolor=#d6d6d6
| 97531 ||  || — || February 29, 2000 || Socorro || LINEAR || — || align=right | 5.9 km || 
|-id=532 bgcolor=#d6d6d6
| 97532 ||  || — || February 29, 2000 || Socorro || LINEAR || — || align=right | 4.6 km || 
|-id=533 bgcolor=#d6d6d6
| 97533 ||  || — || February 29, 2000 || Socorro || LINEAR || — || align=right | 2.6 km || 
|-id=534 bgcolor=#d6d6d6
| 97534 ||  || — || February 29, 2000 || Socorro || LINEAR || — || align=right | 5.8 km || 
|-id=535 bgcolor=#d6d6d6
| 97535 ||  || — || February 29, 2000 || Socorro || LINEAR || — || align=right | 5.4 km || 
|-id=536 bgcolor=#d6d6d6
| 97536 ||  || — || February 29, 2000 || Socorro || LINEAR || — || align=right | 5.1 km || 
|-id=537 bgcolor=#d6d6d6
| 97537 ||  || — || February 29, 2000 || Socorro || LINEAR || — || align=right | 5.6 km || 
|-id=538 bgcolor=#d6d6d6
| 97538 ||  || — || February 29, 2000 || Socorro || LINEAR || — || align=right | 4.8 km || 
|-id=539 bgcolor=#d6d6d6
| 97539 ||  || — || February 29, 2000 || Socorro || LINEAR || HYG || align=right | 6.2 km || 
|-id=540 bgcolor=#d6d6d6
| 97540 ||  || — || February 29, 2000 || Socorro || LINEAR || — || align=right | 6.6 km || 
|-id=541 bgcolor=#d6d6d6
| 97541 ||  || — || February 29, 2000 || Socorro || LINEAR || EUP || align=right | 9.2 km || 
|-id=542 bgcolor=#d6d6d6
| 97542 ||  || — || February 29, 2000 || Socorro || LINEAR || — || align=right | 3.8 km || 
|-id=543 bgcolor=#d6d6d6
| 97543 ||  || — || February 29, 2000 || Socorro || LINEAR || EOS || align=right | 3.5 km || 
|-id=544 bgcolor=#d6d6d6
| 97544 ||  || — || February 29, 2000 || Socorro || LINEAR || — || align=right | 4.7 km || 
|-id=545 bgcolor=#d6d6d6
| 97545 ||  || — || February 29, 2000 || Socorro || LINEAR || EOS || align=right | 3.3 km || 
|-id=546 bgcolor=#d6d6d6
| 97546 ||  || — || February 29, 2000 || Socorro || LINEAR || THM || align=right | 7.1 km || 
|-id=547 bgcolor=#d6d6d6
| 97547 ||  || — || February 29, 2000 || Socorro || LINEAR || THM || align=right | 5.4 km || 
|-id=548 bgcolor=#d6d6d6
| 97548 ||  || — || February 29, 2000 || Socorro || LINEAR || — || align=right | 3.3 km || 
|-id=549 bgcolor=#d6d6d6
| 97549 ||  || — || February 29, 2000 || Socorro || LINEAR || — || align=right | 4.6 km || 
|-id=550 bgcolor=#d6d6d6
| 97550 ||  || — || February 29, 2000 || Socorro || LINEAR || — || align=right | 4.6 km || 
|-id=551 bgcolor=#d6d6d6
| 97551 ||  || — || February 29, 2000 || Socorro || LINEAR || HYG || align=right | 4.9 km || 
|-id=552 bgcolor=#d6d6d6
| 97552 ||  || — || February 29, 2000 || Socorro || LINEAR || — || align=right | 8.3 km || 
|-id=553 bgcolor=#d6d6d6
| 97553 ||  || — || February 29, 2000 || Socorro || LINEAR || — || align=right | 3.9 km || 
|-id=554 bgcolor=#d6d6d6
| 97554 ||  || — || February 29, 2000 || Socorro || LINEAR || — || align=right | 4.3 km || 
|-id=555 bgcolor=#d6d6d6
| 97555 ||  || — || February 29, 2000 || Socorro || LINEAR || — || align=right | 4.1 km || 
|-id=556 bgcolor=#d6d6d6
| 97556 ||  || — || February 29, 2000 || Socorro || LINEAR || — || align=right | 4.1 km || 
|-id=557 bgcolor=#d6d6d6
| 97557 ||  || — || February 29, 2000 || Socorro || LINEAR || HYG || align=right | 7.8 km || 
|-id=558 bgcolor=#d6d6d6
| 97558 ||  || — || February 29, 2000 || Socorro || LINEAR || — || align=right | 6.0 km || 
|-id=559 bgcolor=#fefefe
| 97559 ||  || — || February 29, 2000 || Socorro || LINEAR || V || align=right | 1.3 km || 
|-id=560 bgcolor=#d6d6d6
| 97560 ||  || — || February 29, 2000 || Socorro || LINEAR || 7:4 || align=right | 7.7 km || 
|-id=561 bgcolor=#d6d6d6
| 97561 ||  || — || February 29, 2000 || Socorro || LINEAR || THM || align=right | 6.4 km || 
|-id=562 bgcolor=#d6d6d6
| 97562 ||  || — || February 29, 2000 || Socorro || LINEAR || — || align=right | 7.4 km || 
|-id=563 bgcolor=#E9E9E9
| 97563 ||  || — || February 28, 2000 || Socorro || LINEAR || AGN || align=right | 3.1 km || 
|-id=564 bgcolor=#d6d6d6
| 97564 ||  || — || February 29, 2000 || Socorro || LINEAR || — || align=right | 5.9 km || 
|-id=565 bgcolor=#d6d6d6
| 97565 ||  || — || February 27, 2000 || Kitt Peak || Spacewatch || — || align=right | 6.2 km || 
|-id=566 bgcolor=#d6d6d6
| 97566 ||  || — || February 28, 2000 || Socorro || LINEAR || — || align=right | 6.8 km || 
|-id=567 bgcolor=#d6d6d6
| 97567 ||  || — || February 28, 2000 || Socorro || LINEAR || — || align=right | 8.5 km || 
|-id=568 bgcolor=#d6d6d6
| 97568 ||  || — || February 28, 2000 || Socorro || LINEAR || 7:4 || align=right | 8.8 km || 
|-id=569 bgcolor=#d6d6d6
| 97569 ||  || — || February 29, 2000 || Socorro || LINEAR || EOS || align=right | 6.6 km || 
|-id=570 bgcolor=#d6d6d6
| 97570 ||  || — || February 29, 2000 || Socorro || LINEAR || — || align=right | 6.4 km || 
|-id=571 bgcolor=#d6d6d6
| 97571 ||  || — || February 29, 2000 || Socorro || LINEAR || — || align=right | 8.0 km || 
|-id=572 bgcolor=#d6d6d6
| 97572 ||  || — || February 29, 2000 || Socorro || LINEAR || — || align=right | 7.5 km || 
|-id=573 bgcolor=#d6d6d6
| 97573 ||  || — || February 28, 2000 || Socorro || LINEAR || — || align=right | 11 km || 
|-id=574 bgcolor=#d6d6d6
| 97574 ||  || — || February 29, 2000 || Socorro || LINEAR || KOR || align=right | 2.6 km || 
|-id=575 bgcolor=#d6d6d6
| 97575 ||  || — || February 29, 2000 || Socorro || LINEAR || EOS || align=right | 4.6 km || 
|-id=576 bgcolor=#d6d6d6
| 97576 ||  || — || February 25, 2000 || Uccle || T. Pauwels || TIR || align=right | 7.0 km || 
|-id=577 bgcolor=#d6d6d6
| 97577 ||  || — || February 29, 2000 || Socorro || LINEAR || — || align=right | 4.4 km || 
|-id=578 bgcolor=#d6d6d6
| 97578 ||  || — || February 27, 2000 || Catalina || CSS || — || align=right | 7.9 km || 
|-id=579 bgcolor=#d6d6d6
| 97579 ||  || — || March 4, 2000 || Farra d'Isonzo || Farra d'Isonzo || — || align=right | 5.9 km || 
|-id=580 bgcolor=#d6d6d6
| 97580 ||  || — || March 3, 2000 || Socorro || LINEAR || THM || align=right | 6.6 km || 
|-id=581 bgcolor=#E9E9E9
| 97581 ||  || — || March 4, 2000 || Socorro || LINEAR || DOR || align=right | 6.3 km || 
|-id=582 bgcolor=#d6d6d6
| 97582 Hijikawa ||  ||  || March 6, 2000 || Kuma Kogen || A. Nakamura || THM || align=right | 6.6 km || 
|-id=583 bgcolor=#d6d6d6
| 97583 ||  || — || March 3, 2000 || Socorro || LINEAR || — || align=right | 5.6 km || 
|-id=584 bgcolor=#d6d6d6
| 97584 ||  || — || March 8, 2000 || Kitt Peak || Spacewatch || TIR || align=right | 3.9 km || 
|-id=585 bgcolor=#d6d6d6
| 97585 ||  || — || March 8, 2000 || Kitt Peak || Spacewatch || HYG || align=right | 8.0 km || 
|-id=586 bgcolor=#fefefe
| 97586 ||  || — || March 8, 2000 || Socorro || LINEAR || H || align=right | 1.2 km || 
|-id=587 bgcolor=#d6d6d6
| 97587 ||  || — || March 5, 2000 || Socorro || LINEAR || — || align=right | 6.7 km || 
|-id=588 bgcolor=#d6d6d6
| 97588 ||  || — || March 5, 2000 || Socorro || LINEAR || HYG || align=right | 6.8 km || 
|-id=589 bgcolor=#d6d6d6
| 97589 ||  || — || March 5, 2000 || Socorro || LINEAR || — || align=right | 5.4 km || 
|-id=590 bgcolor=#fefefe
| 97590 ||  || — || March 5, 2000 || Socorro || LINEAR || — || align=right | 2.2 km || 
|-id=591 bgcolor=#d6d6d6
| 97591 ||  || — || March 5, 2000 || Socorro || LINEAR || — || align=right | 11 km || 
|-id=592 bgcolor=#d6d6d6
| 97592 ||  || — || March 5, 2000 || Socorro || LINEAR || — || align=right | 8.4 km || 
|-id=593 bgcolor=#fefefe
| 97593 ||  || — || March 3, 2000 || Socorro || LINEAR || NYS || align=right | 2.8 km || 
|-id=594 bgcolor=#d6d6d6
| 97594 ||  || — || March 8, 2000 || Socorro || LINEAR || — || align=right | 10 km || 
|-id=595 bgcolor=#d6d6d6
| 97595 ||  || — || March 8, 2000 || Socorro || LINEAR || HYG || align=right | 7.3 km || 
|-id=596 bgcolor=#d6d6d6
| 97596 ||  || — || March 8, 2000 || Socorro || LINEAR || — || align=right | 6.0 km || 
|-id=597 bgcolor=#d6d6d6
| 97597 ||  || — || March 11, 2000 || Boca Raton || B. A. Segal || — || align=right | 4.5 km || 
|-id=598 bgcolor=#d6d6d6
| 97598 ||  || — || March 3, 2000 || Kitt Peak || Spacewatch || THM || align=right | 5.5 km || 
|-id=599 bgcolor=#d6d6d6
| 97599 ||  || — || March 8, 2000 || Socorro || LINEAR || ALA || align=right | 9.5 km || 
|-id=600 bgcolor=#d6d6d6
| 97600 ||  || — || March 10, 2000 || Socorro || LINEAR || THM || align=right | 5.5 km || 
|}

97601–97700 

|-bgcolor=#E9E9E9
| 97601 ||  || — || March 10, 2000 || Socorro || LINEAR || — || align=right | 4.6 km || 
|-id=602 bgcolor=#d6d6d6
| 97602 ||  || — || March 10, 2000 || Socorro || LINEAR || — || align=right | 7.6 km || 
|-id=603 bgcolor=#d6d6d6
| 97603 ||  || — || March 5, 2000 || Socorro || LINEAR || EOS || align=right | 5.6 km || 
|-id=604 bgcolor=#d6d6d6
| 97604 ||  || — || March 5, 2000 || Socorro || LINEAR || EOS || align=right | 4.6 km || 
|-id=605 bgcolor=#d6d6d6
| 97605 ||  || — || March 5, 2000 || Socorro || LINEAR || — || align=right | 6.6 km || 
|-id=606 bgcolor=#d6d6d6
| 97606 ||  || — || March 5, 2000 || Socorro || LINEAR || EOS || align=right | 4.2 km || 
|-id=607 bgcolor=#d6d6d6
| 97607 ||  || — || March 5, 2000 || Socorro || LINEAR || — || align=right | 5.5 km || 
|-id=608 bgcolor=#d6d6d6
| 97608 ||  || — || March 5, 2000 || Socorro || LINEAR || — || align=right | 7.9 km || 
|-id=609 bgcolor=#E9E9E9
| 97609 ||  || — || March 8, 2000 || Socorro || LINEAR || PAD || align=right | 5.0 km || 
|-id=610 bgcolor=#d6d6d6
| 97610 ||  || — || March 8, 2000 || Socorro || LINEAR || — || align=right | 6.5 km || 
|-id=611 bgcolor=#d6d6d6
| 97611 ||  || — || March 8, 2000 || Socorro || LINEAR || — || align=right | 3.9 km || 
|-id=612 bgcolor=#d6d6d6
| 97612 ||  || — || March 8, 2000 || Socorro || LINEAR || EOS || align=right | 4.2 km || 
|-id=613 bgcolor=#d6d6d6
| 97613 ||  || — || March 8, 2000 || Socorro || LINEAR || — || align=right | 5.6 km || 
|-id=614 bgcolor=#d6d6d6
| 97614 ||  || — || March 9, 2000 || Socorro || LINEAR || — || align=right | 5.7 km || 
|-id=615 bgcolor=#d6d6d6
| 97615 ||  || — || March 12, 2000 || Kitt Peak || Spacewatch || — || align=right | 5.9 km || 
|-id=616 bgcolor=#d6d6d6
| 97616 ||  || — || March 14, 2000 || Kitt Peak || Spacewatch || — || align=right | 4.1 km || 
|-id=617 bgcolor=#d6d6d6
| 97617 ||  || — || March 11, 2000 || Anderson Mesa || LONEOS || — || align=right | 9.3 km || 
|-id=618 bgcolor=#d6d6d6
| 97618 ||  || — || March 11, 2000 || Anderson Mesa || LONEOS || — || align=right | 4.8 km || 
|-id=619 bgcolor=#d6d6d6
| 97619 ||  || — || March 8, 2000 || Socorro || LINEAR || — || align=right | 3.9 km || 
|-id=620 bgcolor=#d6d6d6
| 97620 ||  || — || March 8, 2000 || Socorro || LINEAR || EOS || align=right | 4.0 km || 
|-id=621 bgcolor=#d6d6d6
| 97621 ||  || — || March 8, 2000 || Haleakala || NEAT || — || align=right | 6.3 km || 
|-id=622 bgcolor=#d6d6d6
| 97622 ||  || — || March 11, 2000 || Anderson Mesa || LONEOS || — || align=right | 6.7 km || 
|-id=623 bgcolor=#d6d6d6
| 97623 ||  || — || March 11, 2000 || Anderson Mesa || LONEOS || — || align=right | 8.4 km || 
|-id=624 bgcolor=#d6d6d6
| 97624 ||  || — || March 11, 2000 || Anderson Mesa || LONEOS || — || align=right | 7.3 km || 
|-id=625 bgcolor=#E9E9E9
| 97625 ||  || — || March 11, 2000 || Anderson Mesa || LONEOS || — || align=right | 2.8 km || 
|-id=626 bgcolor=#d6d6d6
| 97626 ||  || — || March 11, 2000 || Socorro || LINEAR || THM || align=right | 6.5 km || 
|-id=627 bgcolor=#d6d6d6
| 97627 ||  || — || March 11, 2000 || Anderson Mesa || LONEOS || — || align=right | 8.4 km || 
|-id=628 bgcolor=#fefefe
| 97628 ||  || — || March 11, 2000 || Anderson Mesa || LONEOS || — || align=right | 1.8 km || 
|-id=629 bgcolor=#d6d6d6
| 97629 ||  || — || March 11, 2000 || Anderson Mesa || LONEOS || — || align=right | 8.0 km || 
|-id=630 bgcolor=#d6d6d6
| 97630 ||  || — || March 12, 2000 || Socorro || LINEAR || — || align=right | 5.5 km || 
|-id=631 bgcolor=#d6d6d6
| 97631 Kentrobinson ||  ||  || March 3, 2000 || Anderson Mesa || L. H. Wasserman || — || align=right | 7.1 km || 
|-id=632 bgcolor=#d6d6d6
| 97632 ||  || — || March 3, 2000 || Catalina || CSS || — || align=right | 6.6 km || 
|-id=633 bgcolor=#fefefe
| 97633 ||  || — || March 6, 2000 || Haleakala || NEAT || V || align=right | 1.7 km || 
|-id=634 bgcolor=#d6d6d6
| 97634 ||  || — || March 6, 2000 || Haleakala || NEAT || HYG || align=right | 5.8 km || 
|-id=635 bgcolor=#d6d6d6
| 97635 ||  || — || March 9, 2000 || Socorro || LINEAR || TIR || align=right | 6.0 km || 
|-id=636 bgcolor=#d6d6d6
| 97636 ||  || — || March 9, 2000 || Socorro || LINEAR || — || align=right | 6.3 km || 
|-id=637 bgcolor=#d6d6d6
| 97637 Blennert ||  ||  || March 10, 2000 || Catalina || CSS || — || align=right | 8.3 km || 
|-id=638 bgcolor=#d6d6d6
| 97638 ||  || — || March 3, 2000 || Socorro || LINEAR || ANF || align=right | 3.4 km || 
|-id=639 bgcolor=#d6d6d6
| 97639 ||  || — || March 3, 2000 || Socorro || LINEAR || — || align=right | 5.5 km || 
|-id=640 bgcolor=#d6d6d6
| 97640 ||  || — || March 3, 2000 || Socorro || LINEAR || HYG || align=right | 6.2 km || 
|-id=641 bgcolor=#d6d6d6
| 97641 ||  || — || March 4, 2000 || Socorro || LINEAR || — || align=right | 5.7 km || 
|-id=642 bgcolor=#d6d6d6
| 97642 ||  || — || March 5, 2000 || Socorro || LINEAR || ALA || align=right | 7.4 km || 
|-id=643 bgcolor=#d6d6d6
| 97643 ||  || — || March 5, 2000 || Socorro || LINEAR || EOS || align=right | 3.7 km || 
|-id=644 bgcolor=#d6d6d6
| 97644 ||  || — || March 5, 2000 || Socorro || LINEAR || VER || align=right | 8.1 km || 
|-id=645 bgcolor=#d6d6d6
| 97645 ||  || — || March 5, 2000 || Socorro || LINEAR || — || align=right | 4.2 km || 
|-id=646 bgcolor=#d6d6d6
| 97646 ||  || — || March 1, 2000 || Catalina || CSS || — || align=right | 8.5 km || 
|-id=647 bgcolor=#d6d6d6
| 97647 ||  || — || March 5, 2000 || Xinglong || SCAP || — || align=right | 4.3 km || 
|-id=648 bgcolor=#fefefe
| 97648 || 2000 FU || — || March 26, 2000 || Socorro || LINEAR || H || align=right | 1.2 km || 
|-id=649 bgcolor=#fefefe
| 97649 ||  || — || March 26, 2000 || Socorro || LINEAR || H || align=right | 1.2 km || 
|-id=650 bgcolor=#d6d6d6
| 97650 ||  || — || March 25, 2000 || Kitt Peak || Spacewatch || HYG || align=right | 5.2 km || 
|-id=651 bgcolor=#d6d6d6
| 97651 ||  || — || March 28, 2000 || Socorro || LINEAR || — || align=right | 4.3 km || 
|-id=652 bgcolor=#d6d6d6
| 97652 ||  || — || March 29, 2000 || Socorro || LINEAR || — || align=right | 6.6 km || 
|-id=653 bgcolor=#d6d6d6
| 97653 ||  || — || March 29, 2000 || Socorro || LINEAR || 7:4 || align=right | 9.2 km || 
|-id=654 bgcolor=#d6d6d6
| 97654 ||  || — || March 29, 2000 || Socorro || LINEAR || VER || align=right | 7.0 km || 
|-id=655 bgcolor=#d6d6d6
| 97655 ||  || — || March 29, 2000 || Socorro || LINEAR || — || align=right | 4.9 km || 
|-id=656 bgcolor=#d6d6d6
| 97656 ||  || — || March 29, 2000 || Socorro || LINEAR || — || align=right | 4.3 km || 
|-id=657 bgcolor=#d6d6d6
| 97657 ||  || — || March 29, 2000 || Socorro || LINEAR || — || align=right | 4.1 km || 
|-id=658 bgcolor=#d6d6d6
| 97658 ||  || — || March 29, 2000 || Socorro || LINEAR || EOS || align=right | 4.2 km || 
|-id=659 bgcolor=#d6d6d6
| 97659 ||  || — || March 29, 2000 || Socorro || LINEAR || — || align=right | 6.3 km || 
|-id=660 bgcolor=#d6d6d6
| 97660 ||  || — || March 29, 2000 || Socorro || LINEAR || — || align=right | 8.9 km || 
|-id=661 bgcolor=#E9E9E9
| 97661 ||  || — || March 29, 2000 || Socorro || LINEAR || — || align=right | 2.9 km || 
|-id=662 bgcolor=#d6d6d6
| 97662 ||  || — || March 27, 2000 || Anderson Mesa || LONEOS || HYG || align=right | 6.5 km || 
|-id=663 bgcolor=#fefefe
| 97663 ||  || — || March 27, 2000 || Anderson Mesa || LONEOS || FLO || align=right | 1.1 km || 
|-id=664 bgcolor=#fefefe
| 97664 ||  || — || March 28, 2000 || Socorro || LINEAR || — || align=right | 2.4 km || 
|-id=665 bgcolor=#d6d6d6
| 97665 ||  || — || March 29, 2000 || Socorro || LINEAR || — || align=right | 5.8 km || 
|-id=666 bgcolor=#d6d6d6
| 97666 ||  || — || March 29, 2000 || Socorro || LINEAR || — || align=right | 5.0 km || 
|-id=667 bgcolor=#d6d6d6
| 97667 ||  || — || March 29, 2000 || Socorro || LINEAR || EUP || align=right | 7.8 km || 
|-id=668 bgcolor=#d6d6d6
| 97668 ||  || — || March 29, 2000 || Socorro || LINEAR || THM || align=right | 7.7 km || 
|-id=669 bgcolor=#d6d6d6
| 97669 ||  || — || March 29, 2000 || Socorro || LINEAR || EOS || align=right | 4.3 km || 
|-id=670 bgcolor=#fefefe
| 97670 ||  || — || March 30, 2000 || Socorro || LINEAR || H || align=right | 1.7 km || 
|-id=671 bgcolor=#E9E9E9
| 97671 ||  || — || March 29, 2000 || Socorro || LINEAR || — || align=right | 3.0 km || 
|-id=672 bgcolor=#d6d6d6
| 97672 ||  || — || March 29, 2000 || Socorro || LINEAR || LIX || align=right | 7.2 km || 
|-id=673 bgcolor=#d6d6d6
| 97673 ||  || — || March 29, 2000 || Socorro || LINEAR || EOS || align=right | 6.2 km || 
|-id=674 bgcolor=#fefefe
| 97674 ||  || — || March 31, 2000 || Kvistaberg || UDAS || V || align=right | 1.7 km || 
|-id=675 bgcolor=#d6d6d6
| 97675 ||  || — || March 29, 2000 || Kitt Peak || Spacewatch || HYG || align=right | 5.5 km || 
|-id=676 bgcolor=#d6d6d6
| 97676 ||  || — || March 29, 2000 || Socorro || LINEAR || ALA || align=right | 8.7 km || 
|-id=677 bgcolor=#d6d6d6
| 97677 Rachelfreed ||  ||  || March 30, 2000 || Catalina || CSS || — || align=right | 5.6 km || 
|-id=678 bgcolor=#d6d6d6
| 97678 ||  || — || April 4, 2000 || Prescott || P. G. Comba || HYG || align=right | 6.4 km || 
|-id=679 bgcolor=#FA8072
| 97679 ||  || — || April 3, 2000 || Socorro || LINEAR || — || align=right | 1.5 km || 
|-id=680 bgcolor=#fefefe
| 97680 ||  || — || April 4, 2000 || Socorro || LINEAR || ERI || align=right | 4.5 km || 
|-id=681 bgcolor=#d6d6d6
| 97681 ||  || — || April 5, 2000 || Socorro || LINEAR || — || align=right | 4.0 km || 
|-id=682 bgcolor=#d6d6d6
| 97682 ||  || — || April 5, 2000 || Socorro || LINEAR || — || align=right | 7.0 km || 
|-id=683 bgcolor=#fefefe
| 97683 ||  || — || April 5, 2000 || Socorro || LINEAR || — || align=right | 1.3 km || 
|-id=684 bgcolor=#d6d6d6
| 97684 ||  || — || April 5, 2000 || Socorro || LINEAR || THM || align=right | 6.9 km || 
|-id=685 bgcolor=#d6d6d6
| 97685 ||  || — || April 5, 2000 || Socorro || LINEAR || — || align=right | 3.4 km || 
|-id=686 bgcolor=#d6d6d6
| 97686 ||  || — || April 5, 2000 || Socorro || LINEAR || — || align=right | 7.9 km || 
|-id=687 bgcolor=#d6d6d6
| 97687 ||  || — || April 5, 2000 || Socorro || LINEAR || THM || align=right | 5.5 km || 
|-id=688 bgcolor=#d6d6d6
| 97688 ||  || — || April 5, 2000 || Socorro || LINEAR || — || align=right | 8.6 km || 
|-id=689 bgcolor=#d6d6d6
| 97689 ||  || — || April 5, 2000 || Socorro || LINEAR || — || align=right | 5.5 km || 
|-id=690 bgcolor=#d6d6d6
| 97690 ||  || — || April 5, 2000 || Socorro || LINEAR || VER || align=right | 7.8 km || 
|-id=691 bgcolor=#d6d6d6
| 97691 ||  || — || April 5, 2000 || Socorro || LINEAR || HYG || align=right | 6.7 km || 
|-id=692 bgcolor=#d6d6d6
| 97692 ||  || — || April 5, 2000 || Socorro || LINEAR || — || align=right | 6.0 km || 
|-id=693 bgcolor=#d6d6d6
| 97693 ||  || — || April 5, 2000 || Socorro || LINEAR || ALA || align=right | 6.0 km || 
|-id=694 bgcolor=#d6d6d6
| 97694 ||  || — || April 5, 2000 || Socorro || LINEAR || HYG || align=right | 6.1 km || 
|-id=695 bgcolor=#d6d6d6
| 97695 ||  || — || April 5, 2000 || Socorro || LINEAR || — || align=right | 7.7 km || 
|-id=696 bgcolor=#d6d6d6
| 97696 ||  || — || April 5, 2000 || Socorro || LINEAR || — || align=right | 3.9 km || 
|-id=697 bgcolor=#d6d6d6
| 97697 ||  || — || April 5, 2000 || Socorro || LINEAR || — || align=right | 6.5 km || 
|-id=698 bgcolor=#d6d6d6
| 97698 ||  || — || April 5, 2000 || Socorro || LINEAR || HYG || align=right | 5.3 km || 
|-id=699 bgcolor=#fefefe
| 97699 ||  || — || April 5, 2000 || Socorro || LINEAR || — || align=right | 1.4 km || 
|-id=700 bgcolor=#d6d6d6
| 97700 ||  || — || April 5, 2000 || Socorro || LINEAR || SHU3:2 || align=right | 14 km || 
|}

97701–97800 

|-bgcolor=#fefefe
| 97701 ||  || — || April 5, 2000 || Socorro || LINEAR || — || align=right | 1.5 km || 
|-id=702 bgcolor=#d6d6d6
| 97702 ||  || — || April 5, 2000 || Socorro || LINEAR || — || align=right | 6.6 km || 
|-id=703 bgcolor=#fefefe
| 97703 ||  || — || April 5, 2000 || Socorro || LINEAR || — || align=right | 1.5 km || 
|-id=704 bgcolor=#d6d6d6
| 97704 ||  || — || April 5, 2000 || Socorro || LINEAR || — || align=right | 6.3 km || 
|-id=705 bgcolor=#d6d6d6
| 97705 ||  || — || April 5, 2000 || Socorro || LINEAR || — || align=right | 5.8 km || 
|-id=706 bgcolor=#d6d6d6
| 97706 ||  || — || April 6, 2000 || Socorro || LINEAR || THM || align=right | 4.5 km || 
|-id=707 bgcolor=#d6d6d6
| 97707 ||  || — || April 3, 2000 || Socorro || LINEAR || VER || align=right | 4.8 km || 
|-id=708 bgcolor=#E9E9E9
| 97708 ||  || — || April 3, 2000 || Socorro || LINEAR || — || align=right | 4.7 km || 
|-id=709 bgcolor=#E9E9E9
| 97709 ||  || — || April 3, 2000 || Socorro || LINEAR || — || align=right | 5.1 km || 
|-id=710 bgcolor=#E9E9E9
| 97710 ||  || — || April 3, 2000 || Socorro || LINEAR || — || align=right | 2.4 km || 
|-id=711 bgcolor=#d6d6d6
| 97711 ||  || — || April 4, 2000 || Socorro || LINEAR || EMA || align=right | 8.2 km || 
|-id=712 bgcolor=#d6d6d6
| 97712 ||  || — || April 4, 2000 || Socorro || LINEAR || — || align=right | 8.5 km || 
|-id=713 bgcolor=#d6d6d6
| 97713 ||  || — || April 4, 2000 || Socorro || LINEAR || — || align=right | 9.5 km || 
|-id=714 bgcolor=#d6d6d6
| 97714 ||  || — || April 4, 2000 || Socorro || LINEAR || HYG || align=right | 9.1 km || 
|-id=715 bgcolor=#d6d6d6
| 97715 ||  || — || April 5, 2000 || Socorro || LINEAR || THM || align=right | 5.5 km || 
|-id=716 bgcolor=#d6d6d6
| 97716 ||  || — || April 7, 2000 || Socorro || LINEAR || HYG || align=right | 7.2 km || 
|-id=717 bgcolor=#d6d6d6
| 97717 ||  || — || April 7, 2000 || Socorro || LINEAR || HYG || align=right | 6.6 km || 
|-id=718 bgcolor=#E9E9E9
| 97718 ||  || — || April 7, 2000 || Socorro || LINEAR || — || align=right | 4.3 km || 
|-id=719 bgcolor=#d6d6d6
| 97719 ||  || — || April 7, 2000 || Socorro || LINEAR || — || align=right | 9.7 km || 
|-id=720 bgcolor=#d6d6d6
| 97720 ||  || — || April 8, 2000 || Socorro || LINEAR || — || align=right | 3.5 km || 
|-id=721 bgcolor=#d6d6d6
| 97721 ||  || — || April 8, 2000 || Socorro || LINEAR || THM || align=right | 7.2 km || 
|-id=722 bgcolor=#d6d6d6
| 97722 ||  || — || April 3, 2000 || Kitt Peak || Spacewatch || — || align=right | 3.9 km || 
|-id=723 bgcolor=#d6d6d6
| 97723 ||  || — || April 12, 2000 || Socorro || LINEAR || — || align=right | 7.4 km || 
|-id=724 bgcolor=#d6d6d6
| 97724 ||  || — || April 4, 2000 || Anderson Mesa || LONEOS || 7:4 || align=right | 11 km || 
|-id=725 bgcolor=#FFC2E0
| 97725 ||  || — || April 2, 2000 || Mauna Kea || D. J. Tholen, R. J. Whiteley || AMO || align=right data-sort-value="0.64" | 640 m || 
|-id=726 bgcolor=#d6d6d6
| 97726 ||  || — || April 7, 2000 || Anderson Mesa || LONEOS || — || align=right | 6.3 km || 
|-id=727 bgcolor=#d6d6d6
| 97727 ||  || — || April 9, 2000 || Anderson Mesa || LONEOS || — || align=right | 5.3 km || 
|-id=728 bgcolor=#d6d6d6
| 97728 ||  || — || April 5, 2000 || Socorro || LINEAR || — || align=right | 4.6 km || 
|-id=729 bgcolor=#d6d6d6
| 97729 ||  || — || April 5, 2000 || Socorro || LINEAR || — || align=right | 7.0 km || 
|-id=730 bgcolor=#d6d6d6
| 97730 ||  || — || April 4, 2000 || Socorro || LINEAR || EUP || align=right | 8.4 km || 
|-id=731 bgcolor=#d6d6d6
| 97731 ||  || — || April 2, 2000 || Anderson Mesa || LONEOS || — || align=right | 5.7 km || 
|-id=732 bgcolor=#d6d6d6
| 97732 ||  || — || April 5, 2000 || Anderson Mesa || LONEOS || — || align=right | 6.1 km || 
|-id=733 bgcolor=#d6d6d6
| 97733 ||  || — || April 5, 2000 || Anderson Mesa || LONEOS || — || align=right | 6.8 km || 
|-id=734 bgcolor=#fefefe
| 97734 ||  || — || April 27, 2000 || Socorro || LINEAR || H || align=right | 1.3 km || 
|-id=735 bgcolor=#fefefe
| 97735 ||  || — || April 28, 2000 || Socorro || LINEAR || — || align=right | 2.9 km || 
|-id=736 bgcolor=#fefefe
| 97736 ||  || — || April 28, 2000 || Socorro || LINEAR || — || align=right | 1.3 km || 
|-id=737 bgcolor=#fefefe
| 97737 ||  || — || April 28, 2000 || Socorro || LINEAR || H || align=right | 1.4 km || 
|-id=738 bgcolor=#d6d6d6
| 97738 ||  || — || April 29, 2000 || Socorro || LINEAR || EUP || align=right | 6.9 km || 
|-id=739 bgcolor=#fefefe
| 97739 ||  || — || April 29, 2000 || Socorro || LINEAR || H || align=right | 2.5 km || 
|-id=740 bgcolor=#d6d6d6
| 97740 ||  || — || April 28, 2000 || Socorro || LINEAR || — || align=right | 3.4 km || 
|-id=741 bgcolor=#fefefe
| 97741 ||  || — || April 30, 2000 || Socorro || LINEAR || H || align=right | 1.2 km || 
|-id=742 bgcolor=#d6d6d6
| 97742 ||  || — || April 25, 2000 || Anderson Mesa || LONEOS || — || align=right | 6.5 km || 
|-id=743 bgcolor=#E9E9E9
| 97743 ||  || — || April 29, 2000 || Socorro || LINEAR || — || align=right | 6.9 km || 
|-id=744 bgcolor=#d6d6d6
| 97744 ||  || — || April 29, 2000 || Socorro || LINEAR || — || align=right | 6.0 km || 
|-id=745 bgcolor=#fefefe
| 97745 ||  || — || April 29, 2000 || Kitt Peak || Spacewatch || — || align=right data-sort-value="0.85" | 850 m || 
|-id=746 bgcolor=#fefefe
| 97746 ||  || — || April 29, 2000 || Socorro || LINEAR || — || align=right | 1.7 km || 
|-id=747 bgcolor=#d6d6d6
| 97747 ||  || — || April 29, 2000 || Socorro || LINEAR || — || align=right | 9.9 km || 
|-id=748 bgcolor=#d6d6d6
| 97748 ||  || — || April 28, 2000 || Anderson Mesa || LONEOS || — || align=right | 9.5 km || 
|-id=749 bgcolor=#d6d6d6
| 97749 ||  || — || April 30, 2000 || Anderson Mesa || LONEOS || — || align=right | 3.2 km || 
|-id=750 bgcolor=#d6d6d6
| 97750 ||  || — || April 30, 2000 || Anderson Mesa || LONEOS || ALA || align=right | 9.4 km || 
|-id=751 bgcolor=#d6d6d6
| 97751 ||  || — || April 30, 2000 || Anderson Mesa || LONEOS || TIR || align=right | 3.9 km || 
|-id=752 bgcolor=#fefefe
| 97752 ||  || — || April 30, 2000 || Anderson Mesa || LONEOS || — || align=right | 1.1 km || 
|-id=753 bgcolor=#d6d6d6
| 97753 ||  || — || April 29, 2000 || Anderson Mesa || LONEOS || — || align=right | 7.9 km || 
|-id=754 bgcolor=#E9E9E9
| 97754 ||  || — || April 28, 2000 || Anderson Mesa || LONEOS || — || align=right | 2.3 km || 
|-id=755 bgcolor=#E9E9E9
| 97755 ||  || — || April 26, 2000 || Anderson Mesa || LONEOS || WAT || align=right | 4.5 km || 
|-id=756 bgcolor=#fefefe
| 97756 || 2000 JY || — || May 1, 2000 || Socorro || LINEAR || H || align=right | 1.7 km || 
|-id=757 bgcolor=#fefefe
| 97757 ||  || — || May 2, 2000 || Socorro || LINEAR || H || align=right | 1.4 km || 
|-id=758 bgcolor=#d6d6d6
| 97758 ||  || — || May 2, 2000 || Socorro || LINEAR || TIR || align=right | 7.4 km || 
|-id=759 bgcolor=#fefefe
| 97759 ||  || — || May 6, 2000 || Socorro || LINEAR || H || align=right | 1.2 km || 
|-id=760 bgcolor=#d6d6d6
| 97760 ||  || — || May 6, 2000 || Socorro || LINEAR || — || align=right | 6.2 km || 
|-id=761 bgcolor=#d6d6d6
| 97761 ||  || — || May 6, 2000 || Socorro || LINEAR || — || align=right | 4.5 km || 
|-id=762 bgcolor=#d6d6d6
| 97762 ||  || — || May 6, 2000 || Socorro || LINEAR || — || align=right | 9.4 km || 
|-id=763 bgcolor=#d6d6d6
| 97763 ||  || — || May 6, 2000 || Socorro || LINEAR || — || align=right | 6.8 km || 
|-id=764 bgcolor=#E9E9E9
| 97764 ||  || — || May 6, 2000 || Socorro || LINEAR || EUN || align=right | 2.3 km || 
|-id=765 bgcolor=#E9E9E9
| 97765 ||  || — || May 7, 2000 || Socorro || LINEAR || WAT || align=right | 5.3 km || 
|-id=766 bgcolor=#d6d6d6
| 97766 ||  || — || May 7, 2000 || Socorro || LINEAR || — || align=right | 6.8 km || 
|-id=767 bgcolor=#d6d6d6
| 97767 ||  || — || May 7, 2000 || Socorro || LINEAR || — || align=right | 4.6 km || 
|-id=768 bgcolor=#d6d6d6
| 97768 ||  || — || May 2, 2000 || Socorro || LINEAR || TIR || align=right | 9.1 km || 
|-id=769 bgcolor=#d6d6d6
| 97769 ||  || — || May 1, 2000 || Anderson Mesa || LONEOS || — || align=right | 5.5 km || 
|-id=770 bgcolor=#E9E9E9
| 97770 ||  || — || May 1, 2000 || Kitt Peak || Spacewatch || DOR || align=right | 6.9 km || 
|-id=771 bgcolor=#E9E9E9
| 97771 ||  || — || May 2, 2000 || Anderson Mesa || LONEOS || DOR || align=right | 5.8 km || 
|-id=772 bgcolor=#d6d6d6
| 97772 ||  || — || May 6, 2000 || Socorro || LINEAR || — || align=right | 9.1 km || 
|-id=773 bgcolor=#d6d6d6
| 97773 ||  || — || May 1, 2000 || Anderson Mesa || LONEOS || — || align=right | 5.2 km || 
|-id=774 bgcolor=#fefefe
| 97774 ||  || — || May 26, 2000 || Socorro || LINEAR || H || align=right | 1.3 km || 
|-id=775 bgcolor=#d6d6d6
| 97775 ||  || — || May 26, 2000 || Socorro || LINEAR || EUP || align=right | 7.6 km || 
|-id=776 bgcolor=#E9E9E9
| 97776 ||  || — || May 28, 2000 || Socorro || LINEAR || — || align=right | 5.1 km || 
|-id=777 bgcolor=#d6d6d6
| 97777 ||  || — || May 28, 2000 || Socorro || LINEAR || THM || align=right | 5.6 km || 
|-id=778 bgcolor=#fefefe
| 97778 ||  || — || May 31, 2000 || Prescott || P. G. Comba || — || align=right | 1.5 km || 
|-id=779 bgcolor=#fefefe
| 97779 ||  || — || May 30, 2000 || Socorro || LINEAR || H || align=right | 1.6 km || 
|-id=780 bgcolor=#d6d6d6
| 97780 ||  || — || May 30, 2000 || Socorro || LINEAR || — || align=right | 7.7 km || 
|-id=781 bgcolor=#fefefe
| 97781 ||  || — || May 28, 2000 || Anderson Mesa || LONEOS || — || align=right | 2.2 km || 
|-id=782 bgcolor=#fefefe
| 97782 ||  || — || May 28, 2000 || Anderson Mesa || LONEOS || — || align=right | 1.9 km || 
|-id=783 bgcolor=#E9E9E9
| 97783 ||  || — || May 27, 2000 || Socorro || LINEAR || — || align=right | 2.3 km || 
|-id=784 bgcolor=#fefefe
| 97784 ||  || — || May 26, 2000 || Socorro || LINEAR || H || align=right | 1.3 km || 
|-id=785 bgcolor=#fefefe
| 97785 ||  || — || July 5, 2000 || Reedy Creek || J. Broughton || — || align=right | 1.8 km || 
|-id=786 bgcolor=#fefefe
| 97786 Oauam ||  ||  || July 5, 2000 || Ondřejov || P. Pravec, P. Kušnirák || — || align=right | 1.5 km || 
|-id=787 bgcolor=#fefefe
| 97787 ||  || — || July 7, 2000 || Socorro || LINEAR || — || align=right | 3.9 km || 
|-id=788 bgcolor=#fefefe
| 97788 ||  || — || July 8, 2000 || Socorro || LINEAR || — || align=right | 2.9 km || 
|-id=789 bgcolor=#fefefe
| 97789 ||  || — || July 7, 2000 || Socorro || LINEAR || FLO || align=right | 2.6 km || 
|-id=790 bgcolor=#fefefe
| 97790 ||  || — || July 7, 2000 || Socorro || LINEAR || NYS || align=right | 1.8 km || 
|-id=791 bgcolor=#fefefe
| 97791 ||  || — || July 7, 2000 || Socorro || LINEAR || FLO || align=right | 2.1 km || 
|-id=792 bgcolor=#fefefe
| 97792 ||  || — || July 10, 2000 || Farpoint || G. Hug || — || align=right | 1.9 km || 
|-id=793 bgcolor=#fefefe
| 97793 ||  || — || July 5, 2000 || Anderson Mesa || LONEOS || — || align=right | 1.6 km || 
|-id=794 bgcolor=#fefefe
| 97794 ||  || — || July 5, 2000 || Anderson Mesa || LONEOS || FLO || align=right | 1.6 km || 
|-id=795 bgcolor=#fefefe
| 97795 ||  || — || July 5, 2000 || Anderson Mesa || LONEOS || — || align=right | 1.7 km || 
|-id=796 bgcolor=#fefefe
| 97796 ||  || — || July 5, 2000 || Anderson Mesa || LONEOS || — || align=right | 2.0 km || 
|-id=797 bgcolor=#fefefe
| 97797 ||  || — || July 5, 2000 || Anderson Mesa || LONEOS || — || align=right | 1.8 km || 
|-id=798 bgcolor=#fefefe
| 97798 ||  || — || July 7, 2000 || Socorro || LINEAR || FLO || align=right | 1.8 km || 
|-id=799 bgcolor=#fefefe
| 97799 ||  || — || July 5, 2000 || Anderson Mesa || LONEOS || FLO || align=right | 1.7 km || 
|-id=800 bgcolor=#fefefe
| 97800 ||  || — || July 5, 2000 || Anderson Mesa || LONEOS || — || align=right | 2.2 km || 
|}

97801–97900 

|-bgcolor=#fefefe
| 97801 ||  || — || July 4, 2000 || Anderson Mesa || LONEOS || FLO || align=right | 1.9 km || 
|-id=802 bgcolor=#fefefe
| 97802 ||  || — || July 3, 2000 || Socorro || LINEAR || FLO || align=right | 1.4 km || 
|-id=803 bgcolor=#fefefe
| 97803 ||  || — || July 29, 2000 || Socorro || LINEAR || — || align=right | 1.8 km || 
|-id=804 bgcolor=#fefefe
| 97804 ||  || — || July 31, 2000 || Socorro || LINEAR || NYS || align=right | 2.1 km || 
|-id=805 bgcolor=#fefefe
| 97805 ||  || — || July 23, 2000 || Socorro || LINEAR || FLO || align=right | 1.6 km || 
|-id=806 bgcolor=#fefefe
| 97806 ||  || — || July 23, 2000 || Socorro || LINEAR || FLO || align=right | 2.5 km || 
|-id=807 bgcolor=#fefefe
| 97807 ||  || — || July 23, 2000 || Socorro || LINEAR || — || align=right | 1.3 km || 
|-id=808 bgcolor=#fefefe
| 97808 ||  || — || July 23, 2000 || Socorro || LINEAR || — || align=right | 1.8 km || 
|-id=809 bgcolor=#fefefe
| 97809 ||  || — || July 30, 2000 || Socorro || LINEAR || FLO || align=right | 1.5 km || 
|-id=810 bgcolor=#fefefe
| 97810 ||  || — || July 30, 2000 || Socorro || LINEAR || — || align=right | 1.5 km || 
|-id=811 bgcolor=#fefefe
| 97811 ||  || — || July 30, 2000 || Socorro || LINEAR || — || align=right | 1.5 km || 
|-id=812 bgcolor=#fefefe
| 97812 ||  || — || July 31, 2000 || Socorro || LINEAR || NYS || align=right | 1.5 km || 
|-id=813 bgcolor=#fefefe
| 97813 ||  || — || July 31, 2000 || Socorro || LINEAR || — || align=right | 1.8 km || 
|-id=814 bgcolor=#fefefe
| 97814 ||  || — || July 31, 2000 || Socorro || LINEAR || — || align=right | 1.8 km || 
|-id=815 bgcolor=#fefefe
| 97815 ||  || — || July 31, 2000 || Socorro || LINEAR || PHO || align=right | 3.6 km || 
|-id=816 bgcolor=#fefefe
| 97816 ||  || — || July 31, 2000 || Socorro || LINEAR || FLO || align=right | 2.0 km || 
|-id=817 bgcolor=#fefefe
| 97817 ||  || — || July 31, 2000 || Socorro || LINEAR || FLO || align=right | 1.7 km || 
|-id=818 bgcolor=#fefefe
| 97818 ||  || — || July 31, 2000 || Socorro || LINEAR || FLO || align=right | 1.8 km || 
|-id=819 bgcolor=#fefefe
| 97819 ||  || — || July 31, 2000 || Socorro || LINEAR || — || align=right | 1.9 km || 
|-id=820 bgcolor=#fefefe
| 97820 ||  || — || July 31, 2000 || Socorro || LINEAR || FLO || align=right | 1.7 km || 
|-id=821 bgcolor=#fefefe
| 97821 ||  || — || July 31, 2000 || Socorro || LINEAR || — || align=right | 2.0 km || 
|-id=822 bgcolor=#fefefe
| 97822 ||  || — || July 30, 2000 || Socorro || LINEAR || — || align=right | 1.8 km || 
|-id=823 bgcolor=#fefefe
| 97823 ||  || — || July 29, 2000 || Anderson Mesa || LONEOS || — || align=right | 1.8 km || 
|-id=824 bgcolor=#fefefe
| 97824 ||  || — || July 29, 2000 || Anderson Mesa || LONEOS || — || align=right | 1.8 km || 
|-id=825 bgcolor=#fefefe
| 97825 ||  || — || July 29, 2000 || Anderson Mesa || LONEOS || FLO || align=right | 1.2 km || 
|-id=826 bgcolor=#fefefe
| 97826 ||  || — || July 29, 2000 || Anderson Mesa || LONEOS || V || align=right | 1.5 km || 
|-id=827 bgcolor=#fefefe
| 97827 ||  || — || July 30, 2000 || Socorro || LINEAR || V || align=right | 1.7 km || 
|-id=828 bgcolor=#fefefe
| 97828 ||  || — || July 31, 2000 || Socorro || LINEAR || V || align=right | 1.9 km || 
|-id=829 bgcolor=#fefefe
| 97829 ||  || — || August 1, 2000 || Socorro || LINEAR || — || align=right | 1.7 km || 
|-id=830 bgcolor=#fefefe
| 97830 ||  || — || August 3, 2000 || Bisei SG Center || BATTeRS || — || align=right | 1.5 km || 
|-id=831 bgcolor=#fefefe
| 97831 ||  || — || August 5, 2000 || Prescott || P. G. Comba || — || align=right | 1.8 km || 
|-id=832 bgcolor=#fefefe
| 97832 ||  || — || August 5, 2000 || Prescott || P. G. Comba || — || align=right | 1.6 km || 
|-id=833 bgcolor=#fefefe
| 97833 ||  || — || August 5, 2000 || Haleakala || NEAT || — || align=right | 1.8 km || 
|-id=834 bgcolor=#FA8072
| 97834 ||  || — || August 2, 2000 || Socorro || LINEAR || PHO || align=right | 2.2 km || 
|-id=835 bgcolor=#fefefe
| 97835 ||  || — || August 5, 2000 || Bisei SG Center || BATTeRS || — || align=right | 2.0 km || 
|-id=836 bgcolor=#fefefe
| 97836 ||  || — || August 9, 2000 || Reedy Creek || J. Broughton || — || align=right | 2.6 km || 
|-id=837 bgcolor=#fefefe
| 97837 ||  || — || August 1, 2000 || Socorro || LINEAR || FLO || align=right | 1.9 km || 
|-id=838 bgcolor=#fefefe
| 97838 ||  || — || August 1, 2000 || Socorro || LINEAR || — || align=right | 4.0 km || 
|-id=839 bgcolor=#fefefe
| 97839 ||  || — || August 1, 2000 || Socorro || LINEAR || — || align=right | 1.4 km || 
|-id=840 bgcolor=#fefefe
| 97840 ||  || — || August 1, 2000 || Socorro || LINEAR || — || align=right | 1.7 km || 
|-id=841 bgcolor=#fefefe
| 97841 ||  || — || August 1, 2000 || Socorro || LINEAR || FLO || align=right | 1.2 km || 
|-id=842 bgcolor=#fefefe
| 97842 ||  || — || August 2, 2000 || Socorro || LINEAR || FLO || align=right | 2.3 km || 
|-id=843 bgcolor=#E9E9E9
| 97843 ||  || — || August 4, 2000 || Haleakala || NEAT || — || align=right | 3.2 km || 
|-id=844 bgcolor=#fefefe
| 97844 ||  || — || August 9, 2000 || Socorro || LINEAR || FLO || align=right | 2.1 km || 
|-id=845 bgcolor=#E9E9E9
| 97845 ||  || — || August 4, 2000 || Haleakala || NEAT || — || align=right | 5.6 km || 
|-id=846 bgcolor=#fefefe
| 97846 ||  || — || August 3, 2000 || Socorro || LINEAR || — || align=right | 3.1 km || 
|-id=847 bgcolor=#fefefe
| 97847 ||  || — || August 2, 2000 || Socorro || LINEAR || — || align=right | 2.2 km || 
|-id=848 bgcolor=#fefefe
| 97848 ||  || — || August 24, 2000 || Socorro || LINEAR || — || align=right | 1.3 km || 
|-id=849 bgcolor=#fefefe
| 97849 ||  || — || August 24, 2000 || Socorro || LINEAR || NYS || align=right | 1.5 km || 
|-id=850 bgcolor=#fefefe
| 97850 ||  || — || August 24, 2000 || Socorro || LINEAR || — || align=right | 1.5 km || 
|-id=851 bgcolor=#fefefe
| 97851 ||  || — || August 24, 2000 || Socorro || LINEAR || — || align=right | 1.6 km || 
|-id=852 bgcolor=#fefefe
| 97852 ||  || — || August 24, 2000 || Višnjan Observatory || K. Korlević, M. Jurić || FLO || align=right | 1.7 km || 
|-id=853 bgcolor=#fefefe
| 97853 ||  || — || August 25, 2000 || Višnjan Observatory || K. Korlević, M. Jurić || — || align=right | 1.8 km || 
|-id=854 bgcolor=#fefefe
| 97854 ||  || — || August 25, 2000 || Črni Vrh || Črni Vrh || — || align=right | 1.9 km || 
|-id=855 bgcolor=#fefefe
| 97855 ||  || — || August 24, 2000 || Socorro || LINEAR || — || align=right | 4.3 km || 
|-id=856 bgcolor=#fefefe
| 97856 ||  || — || August 24, 2000 || Socorro || LINEAR || — || align=right | 1.8 km || 
|-id=857 bgcolor=#fefefe
| 97857 ||  || — || August 24, 2000 || Socorro || LINEAR || FLO || align=right | 1.7 km || 
|-id=858 bgcolor=#fefefe
| 97858 ||  || — || August 25, 2000 || Socorro || LINEAR || — || align=right | 1.8 km || 
|-id=859 bgcolor=#fefefe
| 97859 ||  || — || August 27, 2000 || Needville || Needville Obs. || — || align=right | 2.1 km || 
|-id=860 bgcolor=#fefefe
| 97860 ||  || — || August 27, 2000 || Bisei SG Center || BATTeRS || FLO || align=right | 1.6 km || 
|-id=861 bgcolor=#fefefe
| 97861 ||  || — || August 24, 2000 || Socorro || LINEAR || MAS || align=right | 1.7 km || 
|-id=862 bgcolor=#fefefe
| 97862 ||  || — || August 24, 2000 || Socorro || LINEAR || — || align=right | 4.3 km || 
|-id=863 bgcolor=#fefefe
| 97863 ||  || — || August 24, 2000 || Socorro || LINEAR || — || align=right | 1.6 km || 
|-id=864 bgcolor=#fefefe
| 97864 ||  || — || August 24, 2000 || Socorro || LINEAR || — || align=right | 1.7 km || 
|-id=865 bgcolor=#fefefe
| 97865 ||  || — || August 24, 2000 || Socorro || LINEAR || FLO || align=right | 1.5 km || 
|-id=866 bgcolor=#fefefe
| 97866 ||  || — || August 24, 2000 || Socorro || LINEAR || MAS || align=right | 3.9 km || 
|-id=867 bgcolor=#fefefe
| 97867 ||  || — || August 25, 2000 || Socorro || LINEAR || NYS || align=right | 1.6 km || 
|-id=868 bgcolor=#fefefe
| 97868 ||  || — || August 25, 2000 || Socorro || LINEAR || FLO || align=right | 1.5 km || 
|-id=869 bgcolor=#fefefe
| 97869 ||  || — || August 26, 2000 || Socorro || LINEAR || — || align=right | 2.8 km || 
|-id=870 bgcolor=#fefefe
| 97870 ||  || — || August 26, 2000 || Socorro || LINEAR || V || align=right | 1.2 km || 
|-id=871 bgcolor=#fefefe
| 97871 ||  || — || August 26, 2000 || Socorro || LINEAR || — || align=right | 2.7 km || 
|-id=872 bgcolor=#fefefe
| 97872 ||  || — || August 28, 2000 || Reedy Creek || J. Broughton || FLO || align=right | 3.0 km || 
|-id=873 bgcolor=#fefefe
| 97873 ||  || — || August 24, 2000 || Socorro || LINEAR || — || align=right | 1.7 km || 
|-id=874 bgcolor=#fefefe
| 97874 ||  || — || August 24, 2000 || Socorro || LINEAR || — || align=right | 2.0 km || 
|-id=875 bgcolor=#fefefe
| 97875 ||  || — || August 24, 2000 || Socorro || LINEAR || — || align=right | 1.3 km || 
|-id=876 bgcolor=#fefefe
| 97876 ||  || — || August 24, 2000 || Socorro || LINEAR || — || align=right | 3.7 km || 
|-id=877 bgcolor=#fefefe
| 97877 ||  || — || August 24, 2000 || Socorro || LINEAR || NYS || align=right | 2.7 km || 
|-id=878 bgcolor=#fefefe
| 97878 ||  || — || August 24, 2000 || Socorro || LINEAR || — || align=right | 1.4 km || 
|-id=879 bgcolor=#fefefe
| 97879 ||  || — || August 24, 2000 || Socorro || LINEAR || — || align=right | 1.5 km || 
|-id=880 bgcolor=#fefefe
| 97880 ||  || — || August 24, 2000 || Socorro || LINEAR || — || align=right | 1.8 km || 
|-id=881 bgcolor=#fefefe
| 97881 ||  || — || August 24, 2000 || Socorro || LINEAR || — || align=right | 1.6 km || 
|-id=882 bgcolor=#fefefe
| 97882 ||  || — || August 24, 2000 || Socorro || LINEAR || NYS || align=right | 3.0 km || 
|-id=883 bgcolor=#fefefe
| 97883 ||  || — || August 24, 2000 || Socorro || LINEAR || FLO || align=right | 1.6 km || 
|-id=884 bgcolor=#fefefe
| 97884 ||  || — || August 24, 2000 || Socorro || LINEAR || — || align=right | 1.4 km || 
|-id=885 bgcolor=#fefefe
| 97885 ||  || — || August 25, 2000 || Socorro || LINEAR || FLO || align=right | 1.4 km || 
|-id=886 bgcolor=#FA8072
| 97886 ||  || — || August 25, 2000 || Socorro || LINEAR || — || align=right | 1.9 km || 
|-id=887 bgcolor=#fefefe
| 97887 ||  || — || August 31, 2000 || Socorro || LINEAR || — || align=right | 1.7 km || 
|-id=888 bgcolor=#fefefe
| 97888 ||  || — || August 26, 2000 || Socorro || LINEAR || — || align=right | 1.5 km || 
|-id=889 bgcolor=#fefefe
| 97889 ||  || — || August 26, 2000 || Socorro || LINEAR || — || align=right | 1.8 km || 
|-id=890 bgcolor=#fefefe
| 97890 ||  || — || August 26, 2000 || Socorro || LINEAR || FLO || align=right | 1.3 km || 
|-id=891 bgcolor=#fefefe
| 97891 ||  || — || August 26, 2000 || Socorro || LINEAR || — || align=right | 1.7 km || 
|-id=892 bgcolor=#fefefe
| 97892 ||  || — || August 28, 2000 || Socorro || LINEAR || V || align=right | 1.3 km || 
|-id=893 bgcolor=#C2FFFF
| 97893 ||  || — || August 28, 2000 || Socorro || LINEAR || L5 || align=right | 18 km || 
|-id=894 bgcolor=#fefefe
| 97894 ||  || — || August 28, 2000 || Socorro || LINEAR || V || align=right | 1.4 km || 
|-id=895 bgcolor=#fefefe
| 97895 ||  || — || August 24, 2000 || Socorro || LINEAR || — || align=right | 3.3 km || 
|-id=896 bgcolor=#fefefe
| 97896 ||  || — || August 24, 2000 || Socorro || LINEAR || — || align=right | 1.4 km || 
|-id=897 bgcolor=#fefefe
| 97897 ||  || — || August 24, 2000 || Socorro || LINEAR || NYS || align=right | 1.2 km || 
|-id=898 bgcolor=#fefefe
| 97898 ||  || — || August 24, 2000 || Socorro || LINEAR || — || align=right | 2.2 km || 
|-id=899 bgcolor=#fefefe
| 97899 ||  || — || August 24, 2000 || Socorro || LINEAR || NYS || align=right | 1.4 km || 
|-id=900 bgcolor=#fefefe
| 97900 ||  || — || August 24, 2000 || Socorro || LINEAR || FLO || align=right | 1.3 km || 
|}

97901–98000 

|-bgcolor=#fefefe
| 97901 ||  || — || August 24, 2000 || Socorro || LINEAR || V || align=right | 1.2 km || 
|-id=902 bgcolor=#fefefe
| 97902 ||  || — || August 24, 2000 || Socorro || LINEAR || — || align=right | 2.5 km || 
|-id=903 bgcolor=#fefefe
| 97903 ||  || — || August 24, 2000 || Socorro || LINEAR || — || align=right | 2.3 km || 
|-id=904 bgcolor=#fefefe
| 97904 ||  || — || August 24, 2000 || Socorro || LINEAR || MAS || align=right | 1.7 km || 
|-id=905 bgcolor=#fefefe
| 97905 ||  || — || August 24, 2000 || Socorro || LINEAR || NYS || align=right | 3.7 km || 
|-id=906 bgcolor=#fefefe
| 97906 ||  || — || August 24, 2000 || Socorro || LINEAR || — || align=right | 3.0 km || 
|-id=907 bgcolor=#E9E9E9
| 97907 ||  || — || August 24, 2000 || Socorro || LINEAR || — || align=right | 2.0 km || 
|-id=908 bgcolor=#fefefe
| 97908 ||  || — || August 24, 2000 || Socorro || LINEAR || — || align=right | 3.7 km || 
|-id=909 bgcolor=#fefefe
| 97909 ||  || — || August 24, 2000 || Socorro || LINEAR || — || align=right | 1.4 km || 
|-id=910 bgcolor=#fefefe
| 97910 ||  || — || August 24, 2000 || Socorro || LINEAR || NYS || align=right | 1.4 km || 
|-id=911 bgcolor=#fefefe
| 97911 ||  || — || August 25, 2000 || Socorro || LINEAR || — || align=right | 1.9 km || 
|-id=912 bgcolor=#fefefe
| 97912 ||  || — || August 25, 2000 || Socorro || LINEAR || — || align=right | 2.1 km || 
|-id=913 bgcolor=#fefefe
| 97913 ||  || — || August 25, 2000 || Socorro || LINEAR || V || align=right | 1.2 km || 
|-id=914 bgcolor=#fefefe
| 97914 ||  || — || August 25, 2000 || Socorro || LINEAR || FLO || align=right | 1.7 km || 
|-id=915 bgcolor=#fefefe
| 97915 ||  || — || August 25, 2000 || Socorro || LINEAR || FLO || align=right | 1.5 km || 
|-id=916 bgcolor=#fefefe
| 97916 ||  || — || August 25, 2000 || Socorro || LINEAR || FLO || align=right | 1.6 km || 
|-id=917 bgcolor=#fefefe
| 97917 ||  || — || August 26, 2000 || Socorro || LINEAR || — || align=right | 3.1 km || 
|-id=918 bgcolor=#fefefe
| 97918 ||  || — || August 26, 2000 || Socorro || LINEAR || NYS || align=right | 1.5 km || 
|-id=919 bgcolor=#fefefe
| 97919 ||  || — || August 28, 2000 || Socorro || LINEAR || V || align=right | 1.8 km || 
|-id=920 bgcolor=#fefefe
| 97920 ||  || — || August 28, 2000 || Socorro || LINEAR || — || align=right | 2.0 km || 
|-id=921 bgcolor=#fefefe
| 97921 ||  || — || August 28, 2000 || Socorro || LINEAR || — || align=right | 1.9 km || 
|-id=922 bgcolor=#E9E9E9
| 97922 ||  || — || August 28, 2000 || Socorro || LINEAR || — || align=right | 1.9 km || 
|-id=923 bgcolor=#E9E9E9
| 97923 ||  || — || August 28, 2000 || Socorro || LINEAR || — || align=right | 2.4 km || 
|-id=924 bgcolor=#fefefe
| 97924 ||  || — || August 28, 2000 || Socorro || LINEAR || — || align=right | 1.6 km || 
|-id=925 bgcolor=#fefefe
| 97925 ||  || — || August 28, 2000 || Socorro || LINEAR || FLO || align=right | 2.2 km || 
|-id=926 bgcolor=#fefefe
| 97926 ||  || — || August 28, 2000 || Socorro || LINEAR || — || align=right | 1.5 km || 
|-id=927 bgcolor=#fefefe
| 97927 ||  || — || August 28, 2000 || Socorro || LINEAR || — || align=right | 2.0 km || 
|-id=928 bgcolor=#fefefe
| 97928 ||  || — || August 28, 2000 || Socorro || LINEAR || V || align=right | 2.0 km || 
|-id=929 bgcolor=#fefefe
| 97929 ||  || — || August 28, 2000 || Socorro || LINEAR || V || align=right | 2.4 km || 
|-id=930 bgcolor=#fefefe
| 97930 ||  || — || August 28, 2000 || Socorro || LINEAR || — || align=right | 1.9 km || 
|-id=931 bgcolor=#fefefe
| 97931 ||  || — || August 29, 2000 || Socorro || LINEAR || FLO || align=right | 3.6 km || 
|-id=932 bgcolor=#fefefe
| 97932 ||  || — || August 29, 2000 || Socorro || LINEAR || — || align=right | 1.5 km || 
|-id=933 bgcolor=#fefefe
| 97933 ||  || — || August 24, 2000 || Socorro || LINEAR || — || align=right | 1.9 km || 
|-id=934 bgcolor=#fefefe
| 97934 ||  || — || August 24, 2000 || Socorro || LINEAR || V || align=right | 1.4 km || 
|-id=935 bgcolor=#fefefe
| 97935 ||  || — || August 25, 2000 || Socorro || LINEAR || — || align=right | 1.9 km || 
|-id=936 bgcolor=#fefefe
| 97936 ||  || — || August 25, 2000 || Socorro || LINEAR || — || align=right | 1.4 km || 
|-id=937 bgcolor=#fefefe
| 97937 ||  || — || August 28, 2000 || Socorro || LINEAR || — || align=right | 4.7 km || 
|-id=938 bgcolor=#fefefe
| 97938 ||  || — || August 28, 2000 || Socorro || LINEAR || — || align=right | 1.9 km || 
|-id=939 bgcolor=#fefefe
| 97939 ||  || — || August 28, 2000 || Socorro || LINEAR || — || align=right | 2.2 km || 
|-id=940 bgcolor=#fefefe
| 97940 ||  || — || August 28, 2000 || Socorro || LINEAR || — || align=right | 1.6 km || 
|-id=941 bgcolor=#fefefe
| 97941 ||  || — || August 29, 2000 || Črni Vrh || Črni Vrh || — || align=right | 1.8 km || 
|-id=942 bgcolor=#fefefe
| 97942 ||  || — || August 25, 2000 || Socorro || LINEAR || FLO || align=right | 1.2 km || 
|-id=943 bgcolor=#fefefe
| 97943 ||  || — || August 25, 2000 || Socorro || LINEAR || FLO || align=right | 1.4 km || 
|-id=944 bgcolor=#E9E9E9
| 97944 ||  || — || August 25, 2000 || Socorro || LINEAR || — || align=right | 2.6 km || 
|-id=945 bgcolor=#fefefe
| 97945 ||  || — || August 25, 2000 || Socorro || LINEAR || — || align=right | 2.9 km || 
|-id=946 bgcolor=#fefefe
| 97946 ||  || — || August 25, 2000 || Socorro || LINEAR || — || align=right | 1.7 km || 
|-id=947 bgcolor=#fefefe
| 97947 ||  || — || August 25, 2000 || Socorro || LINEAR || ERI || align=right | 4.5 km || 
|-id=948 bgcolor=#fefefe
| 97948 ||  || — || August 26, 2000 || Socorro || LINEAR || FLO || align=right | 1.3 km || 
|-id=949 bgcolor=#fefefe
| 97949 ||  || — || August 24, 2000 || Socorro || LINEAR || — || align=right | 2.3 km || 
|-id=950 bgcolor=#fefefe
| 97950 ||  || — || August 24, 2000 || Socorro || LINEAR || NYS || align=right | 1.2 km || 
|-id=951 bgcolor=#fefefe
| 97951 ||  || — || August 24, 2000 || Socorro || LINEAR || — || align=right | 2.4 km || 
|-id=952 bgcolor=#fefefe
| 97952 ||  || — || August 25, 2000 || Socorro || LINEAR || — || align=right | 2.1 km || 
|-id=953 bgcolor=#fefefe
| 97953 ||  || — || August 30, 2000 || Višnjan Observatory || K. Korlević || — || align=right | 1.9 km || 
|-id=954 bgcolor=#E9E9E9
| 97954 ||  || — || August 24, 2000 || Socorro || LINEAR || — || align=right | 6.3 km || 
|-id=955 bgcolor=#fefefe
| 97955 ||  || — || August 26, 2000 || Socorro || LINEAR || — || align=right | 1.8 km || 
|-id=956 bgcolor=#fefefe
| 97956 ||  || — || August 26, 2000 || Socorro || LINEAR || FLO || align=right | 3.9 km || 
|-id=957 bgcolor=#fefefe
| 97957 ||  || — || August 26, 2000 || Socorro || LINEAR || — || align=right | 1.6 km || 
|-id=958 bgcolor=#fefefe
| 97958 ||  || — || August 31, 2000 || Socorro || LINEAR || — || align=right | 2.4 km || 
|-id=959 bgcolor=#fefefe
| 97959 ||  || — || August 31, 2000 || Socorro || LINEAR || FLO || align=right | 1.6 km || 
|-id=960 bgcolor=#fefefe
| 97960 ||  || — || August 31, 2000 || Socorro || LINEAR || MAS || align=right | 2.0 km || 
|-id=961 bgcolor=#fefefe
| 97961 ||  || — || August 31, 2000 || Socorro || LINEAR || — || align=right | 1.7 km || 
|-id=962 bgcolor=#E9E9E9
| 97962 ||  || — || August 31, 2000 || Socorro || LINEAR || HNS || align=right | 3.0 km || 
|-id=963 bgcolor=#fefefe
| 97963 ||  || — || August 31, 2000 || Socorro || LINEAR || V || align=right | 1.3 km || 
|-id=964 bgcolor=#fefefe
| 97964 ||  || — || August 31, 2000 || Socorro || LINEAR || NYS || align=right | 1.3 km || 
|-id=965 bgcolor=#fefefe
| 97965 ||  || — || August 31, 2000 || Socorro || LINEAR || — || align=right | 2.1 km || 
|-id=966 bgcolor=#fefefe
| 97966 ||  || — || August 31, 2000 || Socorro || LINEAR || V || align=right | 1.8 km || 
|-id=967 bgcolor=#fefefe
| 97967 ||  || — || August 31, 2000 || Socorro || LINEAR || FLO || align=right | 1.5 km || 
|-id=968 bgcolor=#fefefe
| 97968 ||  || — || August 25, 2000 || Socorro || LINEAR || V || align=right | 1.3 km || 
|-id=969 bgcolor=#fefefe
| 97969 ||  || — || August 25, 2000 || Socorro || LINEAR || V || align=right | 1.6 km || 
|-id=970 bgcolor=#fefefe
| 97970 ||  || — || August 25, 2000 || Socorro || LINEAR || FLO || align=right | 2.5 km || 
|-id=971 bgcolor=#fefefe
| 97971 ||  || — || August 25, 2000 || Socorro || LINEAR || — || align=right | 2.3 km || 
|-id=972 bgcolor=#fefefe
| 97972 ||  || — || August 26, 2000 || Socorro || LINEAR || FLO || align=right | 1.6 km || 
|-id=973 bgcolor=#C2FFFF
| 97973 ||  || — || August 31, 2000 || Socorro || LINEAR || L5 || align=right | 16 km || 
|-id=974 bgcolor=#fefefe
| 97974 ||  || — || August 31, 2000 || Socorro || LINEAR || — || align=right | 1.5 km || 
|-id=975 bgcolor=#fefefe
| 97975 ||  || — || August 31, 2000 || Socorro || LINEAR || — || align=right | 1.8 km || 
|-id=976 bgcolor=#fefefe
| 97976 ||  || — || August 31, 2000 || Socorro || LINEAR || V || align=right | 1.4 km || 
|-id=977 bgcolor=#fefefe
| 97977 ||  || — || August 31, 2000 || Socorro || LINEAR || V || align=right | 1.4 km || 
|-id=978 bgcolor=#fefefe
| 97978 ||  || — || August 31, 2000 || Socorro || LINEAR || V || align=right | 1.7 km || 
|-id=979 bgcolor=#fefefe
| 97979 ||  || — || August 31, 2000 || Socorro || LINEAR || NYS || align=right | 1.5 km || 
|-id=980 bgcolor=#fefefe
| 97980 ||  || — || August 31, 2000 || Socorro || LINEAR || — || align=right | 1.4 km || 
|-id=981 bgcolor=#fefefe
| 97981 ||  || — || August 31, 2000 || Socorro || LINEAR || FLO || align=right | 1.5 km || 
|-id=982 bgcolor=#fefefe
| 97982 ||  || — || August 31, 2000 || Socorro || LINEAR || — || align=right | 2.6 km || 
|-id=983 bgcolor=#fefefe
| 97983 ||  || — || August 31, 2000 || Socorro || LINEAR || — || align=right | 2.1 km || 
|-id=984 bgcolor=#fefefe
| 97984 ||  || — || August 31, 2000 || Socorro || LINEAR || V || align=right | 1.2 km || 
|-id=985 bgcolor=#fefefe
| 97985 ||  || — || August 31, 2000 || Socorro || LINEAR || — || align=right | 1.7 km || 
|-id=986 bgcolor=#fefefe
| 97986 ||  || — || August 31, 2000 || Socorro || LINEAR || — || align=right | 1.8 km || 
|-id=987 bgcolor=#fefefe
| 97987 ||  || — || August 31, 2000 || Socorro || LINEAR || — || align=right | 1.4 km || 
|-id=988 bgcolor=#fefefe
| 97988 ||  || — || August 31, 2000 || Socorro || LINEAR || V || align=right | 1.3 km || 
|-id=989 bgcolor=#fefefe
| 97989 ||  || — || August 26, 2000 || Socorro || LINEAR || FLO || align=right | 1.6 km || 
|-id=990 bgcolor=#fefefe
| 97990 ||  || — || August 26, 2000 || Socorro || LINEAR || — || align=right | 2.2 km || 
|-id=991 bgcolor=#fefefe
| 97991 ||  || — || August 26, 2000 || Socorro || LINEAR || NYS || align=right | 1.5 km || 
|-id=992 bgcolor=#fefefe
| 97992 ||  || — || August 26, 2000 || Socorro || LINEAR || — || align=right | 1.5 km || 
|-id=993 bgcolor=#fefefe
| 97993 ||  || — || August 26, 2000 || Socorro || LINEAR || V || align=right | 1.6 km || 
|-id=994 bgcolor=#fefefe
| 97994 ||  || — || August 26, 2000 || Socorro || LINEAR || — || align=right | 1.9 km || 
|-id=995 bgcolor=#fefefe
| 97995 ||  || — || August 26, 2000 || Socorro || LINEAR || NYS || align=right | 1.6 km || 
|-id=996 bgcolor=#fefefe
| 97996 ||  || — || August 26, 2000 || Socorro || LINEAR || V || align=right | 1.5 km || 
|-id=997 bgcolor=#fefefe
| 97997 ||  || — || August 26, 2000 || Socorro || LINEAR || FLO || align=right | 2.6 km || 
|-id=998 bgcolor=#fefefe
| 97998 ||  || — || August 26, 2000 || Socorro || LINEAR || — || align=right | 1.9 km || 
|-id=999 bgcolor=#fefefe
| 97999 ||  || — || August 26, 2000 || Socorro || LINEAR || V || align=right | 1.8 km || 
|-id=000 bgcolor=#fefefe
| 98000 ||  || — || August 29, 2000 || Socorro || LINEAR || — || align=right | 1.6 km || 
|}

References

External links 
 Discovery Circumstances: Numbered Minor Planets (95001)–(100000) (IAU Minor Planet Center)

0097